

386001–386100 

|-bgcolor=#fefefe
| 386001 ||  || — || February 15, 2007 || Catalina || CSS || — || align=right data-sort-value="0.75" | 750 m || 
|-id=002 bgcolor=#fefefe
| 386002 ||  || — || February 10, 2007 || Catalina || CSS || — || align=right data-sort-value="0.87" | 870 m || 
|-id=003 bgcolor=#fefefe
| 386003 ||  || — || February 14, 2007 || Mauna Kea || Mauna Kea Obs. || — || align=right | 1.6 km || 
|-id=004 bgcolor=#fefefe
| 386004 ||  || — || February 16, 2007 || Mount Lemmon || Mount Lemmon Survey || — || align=right | 1.2 km || 
|-id=005 bgcolor=#fefefe
| 386005 ||  || — || February 17, 2007 || Kitt Peak || Spacewatch || FLO || align=right data-sort-value="0.60" | 600 m || 
|-id=006 bgcolor=#fefefe
| 386006 ||  || — || January 29, 2007 || Mount Lemmon || Mount Lemmon Survey || V || align=right data-sort-value="0.49" | 490 m || 
|-id=007 bgcolor=#fefefe
| 386007 ||  || — || February 17, 2007 || Kitt Peak || Spacewatch || — || align=right data-sort-value="0.69" | 690 m || 
|-id=008 bgcolor=#fefefe
| 386008 ||  || — || February 17, 2007 || Kitt Peak || Spacewatch || ERI || align=right | 1.7 km || 
|-id=009 bgcolor=#fefefe
| 386009 ||  || — || February 17, 2007 || Kitt Peak || Spacewatch || — || align=right data-sort-value="0.72" | 720 m || 
|-id=010 bgcolor=#fefefe
| 386010 ||  || — || February 17, 2007 || Kitt Peak || Spacewatch || NYS || align=right data-sort-value="0.54" | 540 m || 
|-id=011 bgcolor=#fefefe
| 386011 ||  || — || February 17, 2007 || Kitt Peak || Spacewatch || NYS || align=right data-sort-value="0.46" | 460 m || 
|-id=012 bgcolor=#fefefe
| 386012 ||  || — || February 17, 2007 || Kitt Peak || Spacewatch || MAS || align=right data-sort-value="0.69" | 690 m || 
|-id=013 bgcolor=#fefefe
| 386013 ||  || — || February 17, 2007 || Kitt Peak || Spacewatch || MAS || align=right data-sort-value="0.63" | 630 m || 
|-id=014 bgcolor=#fefefe
| 386014 ||  || — || February 21, 2007 || Mount Lemmon || Mount Lemmon Survey || — || align=right data-sort-value="0.93" | 930 m || 
|-id=015 bgcolor=#fefefe
| 386015 ||  || — || February 17, 2007 || Mount Lemmon || Mount Lemmon Survey || — || align=right data-sort-value="0.69" | 690 m || 
|-id=016 bgcolor=#fefefe
| 386016 ||  || — || February 19, 2007 || Mount Lemmon || Mount Lemmon Survey || — || align=right data-sort-value="0.74" | 740 m || 
|-id=017 bgcolor=#fefefe
| 386017 ||  || — || February 21, 2007 || Kitt Peak || Spacewatch || — || align=right data-sort-value="0.69" | 690 m || 
|-id=018 bgcolor=#fefefe
| 386018 ||  || — || February 19, 2007 || Catalina || CSS || — || align=right | 1.4 km || 
|-id=019 bgcolor=#fefefe
| 386019 ||  || — || February 23, 2007 || Kitt Peak || Spacewatch || — || align=right data-sort-value="0.69" | 690 m || 
|-id=020 bgcolor=#fefefe
| 386020 ||  || — || February 23, 2007 || Kitt Peak || Spacewatch || NYS || align=right data-sort-value="0.81" | 810 m || 
|-id=021 bgcolor=#fefefe
| 386021 ||  || — || February 23, 2007 || Kitt Peak || Spacewatch || — || align=right data-sort-value="0.74" | 740 m || 
|-id=022 bgcolor=#fefefe
| 386022 ||  || — || February 23, 2007 || Mount Lemmon || Mount Lemmon Survey || MAS || align=right data-sort-value="0.61" | 610 m || 
|-id=023 bgcolor=#fefefe
| 386023 ||  || — || February 17, 2007 || Kitt Peak || Spacewatch || — || align=right data-sort-value="0.66" | 660 m || 
|-id=024 bgcolor=#fefefe
| 386024 ||  || — || February 23, 2007 || Mount Lemmon || Mount Lemmon Survey || — || align=right data-sort-value="0.68" | 680 m || 
|-id=025 bgcolor=#fefefe
| 386025 ||  || — || February 21, 2007 || Mount Lemmon || Mount Lemmon Survey || — || align=right data-sort-value="0.75" | 750 m || 
|-id=026 bgcolor=#fefefe
| 386026 ||  || — || March 9, 2007 || Kitt Peak || Spacewatch || NYS || align=right data-sort-value="0.50" | 500 m || 
|-id=027 bgcolor=#fefefe
| 386027 ||  || — || March 10, 2007 || Mount Lemmon || Mount Lemmon Survey || ERI || align=right | 1.6 km || 
|-id=028 bgcolor=#fefefe
| 386028 ||  || — || March 10, 2007 || Mount Lemmon || Mount Lemmon Survey || FLO || align=right data-sort-value="0.66" | 660 m || 
|-id=029 bgcolor=#C2FFFF
| 386029 ||  || — || March 10, 2007 || Mount Lemmon || Mount Lemmon Survey || L5 || align=right | 8.5 km || 
|-id=030 bgcolor=#fefefe
| 386030 ||  || — || March 10, 2007 || Mount Lemmon || Mount Lemmon Survey || NYS || align=right data-sort-value="0.70" | 700 m || 
|-id=031 bgcolor=#fefefe
| 386031 ||  || — || March 12, 2007 || Kleť || Kleť Obs. || — || align=right | 1.0 km || 
|-id=032 bgcolor=#fefefe
| 386032 ||  || — || March 12, 2007 || Altschwendt || W. Ries || NYS || align=right data-sort-value="0.70" | 700 m || 
|-id=033 bgcolor=#fefefe
| 386033 ||  || — || March 10, 2007 || Kitt Peak || Spacewatch || NYS || align=right data-sort-value="0.62" | 620 m || 
|-id=034 bgcolor=#fefefe
| 386034 ||  || — || March 12, 2007 || Calvin-Rehoboth || Calvin–Rehoboth Obs. || — || align=right data-sort-value="0.85" | 850 m || 
|-id=035 bgcolor=#fefefe
| 386035 ||  || — || March 9, 2007 || Mount Lemmon || Mount Lemmon Survey || — || align=right data-sort-value="0.65" | 650 m || 
|-id=036 bgcolor=#fefefe
| 386036 ||  || — || March 9, 2007 || Mount Lemmon || Mount Lemmon Survey || — || align=right data-sort-value="0.90" | 900 m || 
|-id=037 bgcolor=#fefefe
| 386037 ||  || — || February 22, 2007 || Kitt Peak || Spacewatch || — || align=right data-sort-value="0.75" | 750 m || 
|-id=038 bgcolor=#fefefe
| 386038 ||  || — || March 10, 2007 || Kitt Peak || Spacewatch || MAS || align=right data-sort-value="0.72" | 720 m || 
|-id=039 bgcolor=#fefefe
| 386039 ||  || — || March 10, 2007 || Kitt Peak || Spacewatch || NYS || align=right data-sort-value="0.83" | 830 m || 
|-id=040 bgcolor=#fefefe
| 386040 ||  || — || March 10, 2007 || Mount Lemmon || Mount Lemmon Survey || NYS || align=right data-sort-value="0.71" | 710 m || 
|-id=041 bgcolor=#fefefe
| 386041 ||  || — || March 10, 2007 || Mount Lemmon || Mount Lemmon Survey || — || align=right data-sort-value="0.77" | 770 m || 
|-id=042 bgcolor=#fefefe
| 386042 ||  || — || March 10, 2007 || Mount Lemmon || Mount Lemmon Survey || MAS || align=right data-sort-value="0.78" | 780 m || 
|-id=043 bgcolor=#fefefe
| 386043 ||  || — || March 11, 2007 || Kitt Peak || Spacewatch || MAS || align=right data-sort-value="0.86" | 860 m || 
|-id=044 bgcolor=#fefefe
| 386044 ||  || — || March 9, 2007 || Mount Lemmon || Mount Lemmon Survey || — || align=right data-sort-value="0.86" | 860 m || 
|-id=045 bgcolor=#fefefe
| 386045 ||  || — || March 15, 2007 || Mount Lemmon || Mount Lemmon Survey || ERI || align=right | 1.8 km || 
|-id=046 bgcolor=#fefefe
| 386046 ||  || — || March 14, 2007 || Mount Lemmon || Mount Lemmon Survey || NYS || align=right data-sort-value="0.73" | 730 m || 
|-id=047 bgcolor=#fefefe
| 386047 ||  || — || March 15, 2007 || Kitt Peak || Spacewatch || NYS || align=right data-sort-value="0.65" | 650 m || 
|-id=048 bgcolor=#fefefe
| 386048 ||  || — || February 25, 2007 || Mount Lemmon || Mount Lemmon Survey || CLA || align=right | 1.7 km || 
|-id=049 bgcolor=#fefefe
| 386049 ||  || — || March 11, 2007 || Mount Lemmon || Mount Lemmon Survey || NYS || align=right data-sort-value="0.70" | 700 m || 
|-id=050 bgcolor=#fefefe
| 386050 ||  || — || March 12, 2007 || Kitt Peak || Spacewatch || — || align=right | 1.3 km || 
|-id=051 bgcolor=#fefefe
| 386051 ||  || — || March 16, 2007 || Mount Lemmon || Mount Lemmon Survey || MAS || align=right data-sort-value="0.67" | 670 m || 
|-id=052 bgcolor=#fefefe
| 386052 ||  || — || March 20, 2007 || Kitt Peak || Spacewatch || MAS || align=right data-sort-value="0.74" | 740 m || 
|-id=053 bgcolor=#fefefe
| 386053 ||  || — || March 20, 2007 || Mount Lemmon || Mount Lemmon Survey || MAS || align=right data-sort-value="0.76" | 760 m || 
|-id=054 bgcolor=#fefefe
| 386054 ||  || — || March 20, 2007 || Kitt Peak || Spacewatch || V || align=right data-sort-value="0.99" | 990 m || 
|-id=055 bgcolor=#fefefe
| 386055 ||  || — || March 20, 2007 || Catalina || CSS || — || align=right | 2.1 km || 
|-id=056 bgcolor=#fefefe
| 386056 ||  || — || March 24, 2007 || Moletai || Molėtai Obs. || NYS || align=right data-sort-value="0.74" | 740 m || 
|-id=057 bgcolor=#fefefe
| 386057 ||  || — || March 26, 2007 || Mount Lemmon || Mount Lemmon Survey || NYS || align=right data-sort-value="0.69" | 690 m || 
|-id=058 bgcolor=#fefefe
| 386058 ||  || — || March 20, 2007 || Mount Lemmon || Mount Lemmon Survey || NYS || align=right data-sort-value="0.73" | 730 m || 
|-id=059 bgcolor=#fefefe
| 386059 ||  || — || March 26, 2007 || Kitt Peak || Spacewatch || — || align=right data-sort-value="0.85" | 850 m || 
|-id=060 bgcolor=#fefefe
| 386060 ||  || — || April 7, 2007 || Mount Lemmon || Mount Lemmon Survey || — || align=right | 1.8 km || 
|-id=061 bgcolor=#fefefe
| 386061 ||  || — || April 14, 2007 || Kitt Peak || Spacewatch || — || align=right | 1.0 km || 
|-id=062 bgcolor=#fefefe
| 386062 ||  || — || February 26, 2007 || Mount Lemmon || Mount Lemmon Survey || NYS || align=right data-sort-value="0.72" | 720 m || 
|-id=063 bgcolor=#fefefe
| 386063 ||  || — || April 14, 2007 || Kitt Peak || Spacewatch || NYS || align=right data-sort-value="0.79" | 790 m || 
|-id=064 bgcolor=#fefefe
| 386064 ||  || — || April 15, 2007 || Catalina || CSS || — || align=right data-sort-value="0.85" | 850 m || 
|-id=065 bgcolor=#fefefe
| 386065 ||  || — || April 15, 2007 || Catalina || CSS || — || align=right | 1.0 km || 
|-id=066 bgcolor=#fefefe
| 386066 ||  || — || April 16, 2007 || Catalina || CSS || NYS || align=right data-sort-value="0.78" | 780 m || 
|-id=067 bgcolor=#fefefe
| 386067 ||  || — || October 1, 2005 || Mount Lemmon || Mount Lemmon Survey || EUT || align=right data-sort-value="0.67" | 670 m || 
|-id=068 bgcolor=#fefefe
| 386068 ||  || — || April 19, 2007 || Mount Lemmon || Mount Lemmon Survey || MAS || align=right data-sort-value="0.66" | 660 m || 
|-id=069 bgcolor=#fefefe
| 386069 ||  || — || April 19, 2007 || Mount Lemmon || Mount Lemmon Survey || NYS || align=right data-sort-value="0.63" | 630 m || 
|-id=070 bgcolor=#d6d6d6
| 386070 ||  || — || April 11, 2007 || Mount Lemmon || Mount Lemmon Survey || EOS || align=right | 2.1 km || 
|-id=071 bgcolor=#E9E9E9
| 386071 ||  || — || October 15, 2004 || Anderson Mesa || LONEOS || — || align=right | 2.1 km || 
|-id=072 bgcolor=#E9E9E9
| 386072 ||  || — || April 20, 2007 || Mount Lemmon || Mount Lemmon Survey || — || align=right | 1.2 km || 
|-id=073 bgcolor=#fefefe
| 386073 ||  || — || April 20, 2007 || Kitt Peak || Spacewatch || — || align=right data-sort-value="0.86" | 860 m || 
|-id=074 bgcolor=#fefefe
| 386074 ||  || — || October 25, 2005 || Mount Lemmon || Mount Lemmon Survey || NYS || align=right data-sort-value="0.79" | 790 m || 
|-id=075 bgcolor=#fefefe
| 386075 ||  || — || March 26, 2007 || Mount Lemmon || Mount Lemmon Survey || SUL || align=right | 2.2 km || 
|-id=076 bgcolor=#fefefe
| 386076 ||  || — || May 9, 2007 || Mount Lemmon || Mount Lemmon Survey || — || align=right data-sort-value="0.76" | 760 m || 
|-id=077 bgcolor=#fefefe
| 386077 ||  || — || May 7, 2007 || Kitt Peak || Spacewatch || NYS || align=right data-sort-value="0.88" | 880 m || 
|-id=078 bgcolor=#E9E9E9
| 386078 ||  || — || April 25, 2007 || Mount Lemmon || Mount Lemmon Survey || JUN || align=right | 2.8 km || 
|-id=079 bgcolor=#E9E9E9
| 386079 ||  || — || May 9, 2007 || Kitt Peak || Spacewatch || — || align=right | 1.1 km || 
|-id=080 bgcolor=#fefefe
| 386080 ||  || — || May 6, 2007 || Purple Mountain || PMO NEO || — || align=right data-sort-value="0.73" | 730 m || 
|-id=081 bgcolor=#fefefe
| 386081 ||  || — || May 17, 2007 || Kitt Peak || Spacewatch || NYS || align=right data-sort-value="0.75" | 750 m || 
|-id=082 bgcolor=#fefefe
| 386082 ||  || — || May 11, 2007 || Mount Lemmon || Mount Lemmon Survey || SUL || align=right | 2.2 km || 
|-id=083 bgcolor=#fefefe
| 386083 ||  || — || June 9, 2007 || Kitt Peak || Spacewatch || — || align=right data-sort-value="0.98" | 980 m || 
|-id=084 bgcolor=#fefefe
| 386084 ||  || — || June 14, 2007 || Kitt Peak || Spacewatch || MAS || align=right data-sort-value="0.77" | 770 m || 
|-id=085 bgcolor=#E9E9E9
| 386085 ||  || — || June 11, 2007 || Siding Spring || SSS || — || align=right | 1.5 km || 
|-id=086 bgcolor=#E9E9E9
| 386086 ||  || — || January 28, 2006 || Mount Lemmon || Mount Lemmon Survey || GER || align=right | 1.6 km || 
|-id=087 bgcolor=#E9E9E9
| 386087 ||  || — || July 21, 2007 || Wrightwood || J. W. Young || — || align=right | 2.5 km || 
|-id=088 bgcolor=#E9E9E9
| 386088 ||  || — || July 24, 2007 || Reedy Creek || J. Broughton || JUN || align=right | 1.3 km || 
|-id=089 bgcolor=#E9E9E9
| 386089 ||  || — || July 25, 2007 || Lulin Observatory || LUSS || — || align=right | 1.9 km || 
|-id=090 bgcolor=#E9E9E9
| 386090 ||  || — || July 20, 2007 || Lulin Observatory || LUSS || — || align=right | 2.8 km || 
|-id=091 bgcolor=#E9E9E9
| 386091 ||  || — || August 7, 2007 || Reedy Creek || J. Broughton || JUN || align=right | 1.3 km || 
|-id=092 bgcolor=#E9E9E9
| 386092 ||  || — || August 12, 2007 || Great Shefford || P. Birtwhistle || — || align=right | 1.3 km || 
|-id=093 bgcolor=#E9E9E9
| 386093 ||  || — || August 8, 2007 || Socorro || LINEAR || — || align=right | 2.3 km || 
|-id=094 bgcolor=#fefefe
| 386094 ||  || — || August 12, 2007 || Socorro || LINEAR || H || align=right data-sort-value="0.76" | 760 m || 
|-id=095 bgcolor=#E9E9E9
| 386095 ||  || — || August 10, 2007 || Kitt Peak || Spacewatch || MRX || align=right | 1.1 km || 
|-id=096 bgcolor=#d6d6d6
| 386096 ||  || — || August 7, 2007 || Palomar || M. E. Schwamb, M. E. Brown || — || align=right | 2.3 km || 
|-id=097 bgcolor=#E9E9E9
| 386097 ||  || — || August 10, 2007 || Kitt Peak || Spacewatch || — || align=right | 2.1 km || 
|-id=098 bgcolor=#E9E9E9
| 386098 ||  || — || August 10, 2007 || Kitt Peak || Spacewatch || AGN || align=right | 1.0 km || 
|-id=099 bgcolor=#E9E9E9
| 386099 ||  || — || August 13, 2007 || Anderson Mesa || LONEOS || DOR || align=right | 3.3 km || 
|-id=100 bgcolor=#E9E9E9
| 386100 ||  || — || August 10, 2007 || Kitt Peak || Spacewatch || WIT || align=right | 1.3 km || 
|}

386101–386200 

|-bgcolor=#d6d6d6
| 386101 ||  || — || September 5, 2007 || Anderson Mesa || LONEOS || — || align=right | 4.6 km || 
|-id=102 bgcolor=#E9E9E9
| 386102 ||  || — || September 8, 2007 || Andrushivka || Andrushivka Obs. || — || align=right | 1.7 km || 
|-id=103 bgcolor=#fefefe
| 386103 ||  || — || September 9, 2007 || Anderson Mesa || LONEOS || H || align=right data-sort-value="0.82" | 820 m || 
|-id=104 bgcolor=#E9E9E9
| 386104 ||  || — || August 16, 2007 || XuYi || PMO NEO || — || align=right | 2.6 km || 
|-id=105 bgcolor=#E9E9E9
| 386105 ||  || — || September 11, 2007 || Catalina || CSS || — || align=right | 2.3 km || 
|-id=106 bgcolor=#d6d6d6
| 386106 ||  || — || September 11, 2007 || Kitt Peak || Spacewatch || — || align=right | 2.7 km || 
|-id=107 bgcolor=#E9E9E9
| 386107 ||  || — || September 11, 2007 || Kitt Peak || Spacewatch || — || align=right | 2.4 km || 
|-id=108 bgcolor=#d6d6d6
| 386108 ||  || — || September 12, 2007 || Catalina || CSS || — || align=right | 3.7 km || 
|-id=109 bgcolor=#E9E9E9
| 386109 ||  || — || September 12, 2007 || Mount Lemmon || Mount Lemmon Survey || NEM || align=right | 2.4 km || 
|-id=110 bgcolor=#d6d6d6
| 386110 ||  || — || September 12, 2007 || Mount Lemmon || Mount Lemmon Survey || — || align=right | 2.3 km || 
|-id=111 bgcolor=#d6d6d6
| 386111 ||  || — || September 13, 2007 || Kitt Peak || Spacewatch || — || align=right | 3.1 km || 
|-id=112 bgcolor=#E9E9E9
| 386112 ||  || — || September 13, 2007 || Socorro || LINEAR || — || align=right | 1.6 km || 
|-id=113 bgcolor=#fefefe
| 386113 ||  || — || September 11, 2007 || Purple Mountain || PMO NEO || H || align=right data-sort-value="0.84" | 840 m || 
|-id=114 bgcolor=#d6d6d6
| 386114 ||  || — || September 10, 2007 || Kitt Peak || Spacewatch || KOR || align=right | 1.4 km || 
|-id=115 bgcolor=#E9E9E9
| 386115 ||  || — || September 10, 2007 || Kitt Peak || Spacewatch || — || align=right | 2.0 km || 
|-id=116 bgcolor=#d6d6d6
| 386116 ||  || — || September 10, 2007 || Kitt Peak || Spacewatch || — || align=right | 1.9 km || 
|-id=117 bgcolor=#E9E9E9
| 386117 ||  || — || November 30, 2003 || Kitt Peak || Spacewatch || AGN || align=right | 1.4 km || 
|-id=118 bgcolor=#E9E9E9
| 386118 ||  || — || September 14, 2007 || Mount Lemmon || Mount Lemmon Survey || — || align=right | 2.5 km || 
|-id=119 bgcolor=#d6d6d6
| 386119 ||  || — || September 10, 2007 || Mount Lemmon || Mount Lemmon Survey || — || align=right | 4.8 km || 
|-id=120 bgcolor=#E9E9E9
| 386120 ||  || — || September 14, 2007 || Kitt Peak || Spacewatch || — || align=right | 1.8 km || 
|-id=121 bgcolor=#d6d6d6
| 386121 ||  || — || September 14, 2007 || Kitt Peak || Spacewatch || — || align=right | 2.0 km || 
|-id=122 bgcolor=#E9E9E9
| 386122 ||  || — || September 12, 2007 || Mount Lemmon || Mount Lemmon Survey || AGN || align=right | 1.1 km || 
|-id=123 bgcolor=#fefefe
| 386123 ||  || — || September 2, 2007 || Mount Lemmon || Mount Lemmon Survey || H || align=right data-sort-value="0.81" | 810 m || 
|-id=124 bgcolor=#E9E9E9
| 386124 ||  || — || September 14, 2007 || Mount Lemmon || Mount Lemmon Survey || — || align=right | 2.3 km || 
|-id=125 bgcolor=#d6d6d6
| 386125 ||  || — || September 13, 2007 || Catalina || CSS || — || align=right | 2.3 km || 
|-id=126 bgcolor=#E9E9E9
| 386126 ||  || — || September 9, 2007 || Kitt Peak || Spacewatch || — || align=right | 2.4 km || 
|-id=127 bgcolor=#E9E9E9
| 386127 ||  || — || September 13, 2007 || Socorro || LINEAR || — || align=right | 2.5 km || 
|-id=128 bgcolor=#d6d6d6
| 386128 ||  || — || September 15, 2007 || Mount Lemmon || Mount Lemmon Survey || — || align=right | 3.0 km || 
|-id=129 bgcolor=#d6d6d6
| 386129 ||  || — || September 18, 2007 || Mount Lemmon || Mount Lemmon Survey || — || align=right | 3.4 km || 
|-id=130 bgcolor=#d6d6d6
| 386130 ||  || — || September 14, 2007 || Mount Lemmon || Mount Lemmon Survey || — || align=right | 3.2 km || 
|-id=131 bgcolor=#d6d6d6
| 386131 ||  || — || September 13, 2007 || Mount Lemmon || Mount Lemmon Survey || — || align=right | 2.2 km || 
|-id=132 bgcolor=#d6d6d6
| 386132 ||  || — || October 6, 2007 || Kitt Peak || Spacewatch || — || align=right | 2.3 km || 
|-id=133 bgcolor=#d6d6d6
| 386133 ||  || — || October 6, 2007 || Kitt Peak || Spacewatch || EOS || align=right | 1.6 km || 
|-id=134 bgcolor=#d6d6d6
| 386134 ||  || — || October 7, 2007 || Mount Lemmon || Mount Lemmon Survey || EOS || align=right | 1.6 km || 
|-id=135 bgcolor=#d6d6d6
| 386135 ||  || — || September 11, 2007 || Mount Lemmon || Mount Lemmon Survey || — || align=right | 2.1 km || 
|-id=136 bgcolor=#d6d6d6
| 386136 ||  || — || October 8, 2007 || Purple Mountain || PMO NEO || — || align=right | 4.0 km || 
|-id=137 bgcolor=#d6d6d6
| 386137 ||  || — || October 6, 2007 || Kitt Peak || Spacewatch || — || align=right | 2.5 km || 
|-id=138 bgcolor=#d6d6d6
| 386138 ||  || — || October 6, 2007 || Kitt Peak || Spacewatch || — || align=right | 2.6 km || 
|-id=139 bgcolor=#d6d6d6
| 386139 ||  || — || October 4, 2007 || Kitt Peak || Spacewatch || K-2 || align=right | 1.5 km || 
|-id=140 bgcolor=#d6d6d6
| 386140 ||  || — || October 8, 2007 || Anderson Mesa || LONEOS || — || align=right | 3.9 km || 
|-id=141 bgcolor=#d6d6d6
| 386141 ||  || — || October 7, 2007 || Mount Lemmon || Mount Lemmon Survey || — || align=right | 2.0 km || 
|-id=142 bgcolor=#d6d6d6
| 386142 ||  || — || October 9, 2007 || Socorro || LINEAR || — || align=right | 2.9 km || 
|-id=143 bgcolor=#d6d6d6
| 386143 ||  || — || October 9, 2007 || Socorro || LINEAR || — || align=right | 2.8 km || 
|-id=144 bgcolor=#E9E9E9
| 386144 ||  || — || October 11, 2007 || Socorro || LINEAR || — || align=right | 1.8 km || 
|-id=145 bgcolor=#d6d6d6
| 386145 ||  || — || October 5, 2007 || Kitt Peak || Spacewatch || — || align=right | 3.3 km || 
|-id=146 bgcolor=#d6d6d6
| 386146 ||  || — || October 4, 2007 || Kitt Peak || Spacewatch || — || align=right | 2.0 km || 
|-id=147 bgcolor=#E9E9E9
| 386147 ||  || — || October 4, 2007 || Mount Lemmon || Mount Lemmon Survey || — || align=right | 2.5 km || 
|-id=148 bgcolor=#d6d6d6
| 386148 ||  || — || October 7, 2007 || Mount Lemmon || Mount Lemmon Survey || THM || align=right | 2.2 km || 
|-id=149 bgcolor=#d6d6d6
| 386149 ||  || — || October 8, 2007 || Catalina || CSS || — || align=right | 3.3 km || 
|-id=150 bgcolor=#d6d6d6
| 386150 ||  || — || October 10, 2007 || Kitt Peak || Spacewatch || — || align=right | 2.1 km || 
|-id=151 bgcolor=#d6d6d6
| 386151 ||  || — || October 9, 2007 || Kitt Peak || Spacewatch || — || align=right | 1.9 km || 
|-id=152 bgcolor=#d6d6d6
| 386152 ||  || — || October 8, 2007 || Mount Lemmon || Mount Lemmon Survey || KAR || align=right data-sort-value="0.97" | 970 m || 
|-id=153 bgcolor=#d6d6d6
| 386153 ||  || — || October 12, 2007 || Kitt Peak || Spacewatch || — || align=right | 2.7 km || 
|-id=154 bgcolor=#d6d6d6
| 386154 ||  || — || October 6, 2007 || Kitt Peak || Spacewatch || — || align=right | 2.1 km || 
|-id=155 bgcolor=#E9E9E9
| 386155 ||  || — || October 13, 2007 || Kitt Peak || Spacewatch || JUN || align=right | 1.1 km || 
|-id=156 bgcolor=#d6d6d6
| 386156 ||  || — || September 25, 2007 || Mount Lemmon || Mount Lemmon Survey || CHA || align=right | 2.2 km || 
|-id=157 bgcolor=#d6d6d6
| 386157 ||  || — || September 13, 2007 || Catalina || CSS || — || align=right | 3.2 km || 
|-id=158 bgcolor=#d6d6d6
| 386158 ||  || — || October 9, 2007 || Catalina || CSS || — || align=right | 3.1 km || 
|-id=159 bgcolor=#d6d6d6
| 386159 ||  || — || October 13, 2007 || Catalina || CSS || — || align=right | 2.3 km || 
|-id=160 bgcolor=#d6d6d6
| 386160 ||  || — || October 14, 2007 || Kitt Peak || Spacewatch || — || align=right | 2.7 km || 
|-id=161 bgcolor=#d6d6d6
| 386161 ||  || — || October 11, 2007 || Kitt Peak || Spacewatch || THM || align=right | 1.9 km || 
|-id=162 bgcolor=#d6d6d6
| 386162 ||  || — || October 15, 2007 || Kitt Peak || Spacewatch || — || align=right | 3.0 km || 
|-id=163 bgcolor=#d6d6d6
| 386163 ||  || — || October 11, 2007 || Catalina || CSS || — || align=right | 2.5 km || 
|-id=164 bgcolor=#d6d6d6
| 386164 ||  || — || October 12, 2007 || Kitt Peak || Spacewatch || — || align=right | 1.9 km || 
|-id=165 bgcolor=#E9E9E9
| 386165 ||  || — || October 9, 2007 || Socorro || LINEAR || — || align=right | 2.5 km || 
|-id=166 bgcolor=#d6d6d6
| 386166 ||  || — || October 9, 2007 || Kitt Peak || Spacewatch || — || align=right | 3.5 km || 
|-id=167 bgcolor=#d6d6d6
| 386167 ||  || — || October 16, 2007 || Andrushivka || Andrushivka Obs. || — || align=right | 3.7 km || 
|-id=168 bgcolor=#d6d6d6
| 386168 ||  || — || October 8, 2007 || Kitt Peak || Spacewatch || KOR || align=right | 1.4 km || 
|-id=169 bgcolor=#d6d6d6
| 386169 ||  || — || October 20, 2007 || Mount Lemmon || Mount Lemmon Survey || — || align=right | 3.0 km || 
|-id=170 bgcolor=#d6d6d6
| 386170 ||  || — || March 12, 2005 || Kitt Peak || Spacewatch || — || align=right | 2.3 km || 
|-id=171 bgcolor=#d6d6d6
| 386171 ||  || — || October 10, 2007 || Mount Lemmon || Mount Lemmon Survey || — || align=right | 3.0 km || 
|-id=172 bgcolor=#d6d6d6
| 386172 ||  || — || October 30, 2007 || Kitt Peak || Spacewatch || KOR || align=right | 1.4 km || 
|-id=173 bgcolor=#d6d6d6
| 386173 ||  || — || October 12, 2007 || Kitt Peak || Spacewatch || — || align=right | 2.0 km || 
|-id=174 bgcolor=#d6d6d6
| 386174 ||  || — || October 30, 2007 || Kitt Peak || Spacewatch || — || align=right | 2.4 km || 
|-id=175 bgcolor=#d6d6d6
| 386175 ||  || — || October 31, 2007 || Kitt Peak || Spacewatch || EMA || align=right | 5.1 km || 
|-id=176 bgcolor=#d6d6d6
| 386176 ||  || — || September 15, 2007 || Mount Lemmon || Mount Lemmon Survey || IMH || align=right | 3.1 km || 
|-id=177 bgcolor=#d6d6d6
| 386177 ||  || — || October 16, 2007 || Kitt Peak || Spacewatch || EOS || align=right | 1.9 km || 
|-id=178 bgcolor=#d6d6d6
| 386178 ||  || — || October 18, 2007 || Kitt Peak || Spacewatch || — || align=right | 3.5 km || 
|-id=179 bgcolor=#d6d6d6
| 386179 ||  || — || October 16, 2007 || Mount Lemmon || Mount Lemmon Survey || — || align=right | 3.3 km || 
|-id=180 bgcolor=#d6d6d6
| 386180 ||  || — || November 1, 2007 || Kitt Peak || Spacewatch || — || align=right | 2.0 km || 
|-id=181 bgcolor=#d6d6d6
| 386181 ||  || — || October 18, 2007 || Kitt Peak || Spacewatch || NAE || align=right | 3.2 km || 
|-id=182 bgcolor=#d6d6d6
| 386182 ||  || — || November 2, 2007 || Kitt Peak || Spacewatch || — || align=right | 2.8 km || 
|-id=183 bgcolor=#d6d6d6
| 386183 ||  || — || October 8, 2007 || Kitt Peak || Spacewatch || — || align=right | 2.3 km || 
|-id=184 bgcolor=#d6d6d6
| 386184 ||  || — || November 3, 2007 || Socorro || LINEAR || AEG || align=right | 3.8 km || 
|-id=185 bgcolor=#d6d6d6
| 386185 ||  || — || November 4, 2007 || Socorro || LINEAR || — || align=right | 3.0 km || 
|-id=186 bgcolor=#d6d6d6
| 386186 ||  || — || November 1, 2007 || Kitt Peak || Spacewatch || HYG || align=right | 2.2 km || 
|-id=187 bgcolor=#d6d6d6
| 386187 ||  || — || November 3, 2007 || Kitt Peak || Spacewatch || — || align=right | 2.5 km || 
|-id=188 bgcolor=#E9E9E9
| 386188 ||  || — || November 5, 2007 || Kitt Peak || Spacewatch || NEM || align=right | 2.5 km || 
|-id=189 bgcolor=#d6d6d6
| 386189 ||  || — || November 3, 2007 || Mount Lemmon || Mount Lemmon Survey || TRE || align=right | 3.3 km || 
|-id=190 bgcolor=#d6d6d6
| 386190 ||  || — || October 20, 2007 || Mount Lemmon || Mount Lemmon Survey || — || align=right | 2.5 km || 
|-id=191 bgcolor=#d6d6d6
| 386191 ||  || — || November 4, 2007 || Kitt Peak || Spacewatch || — || align=right | 2.8 km || 
|-id=192 bgcolor=#d6d6d6
| 386192 ||  || — || November 7, 2007 || Kitt Peak || Spacewatch || — || align=right | 2.7 km || 
|-id=193 bgcolor=#d6d6d6
| 386193 ||  || — || October 9, 2007 || Kitt Peak || Spacewatch || — || align=right | 2.5 km || 
|-id=194 bgcolor=#d6d6d6
| 386194 ||  || — || November 7, 2007 || Mount Lemmon || Mount Lemmon Survey || — || align=right | 2.2 km || 
|-id=195 bgcolor=#d6d6d6
| 386195 ||  || — || November 9, 2007 || Kitt Peak || Spacewatch || — || align=right | 4.9 km || 
|-id=196 bgcolor=#d6d6d6
| 386196 ||  || — || November 9, 2007 || Kitt Peak || Spacewatch || — || align=right | 2.8 km || 
|-id=197 bgcolor=#d6d6d6
| 386197 ||  || — || November 9, 2007 || Kitt Peak || Spacewatch || — || align=right | 3.3 km || 
|-id=198 bgcolor=#d6d6d6
| 386198 ||  || — || November 7, 2007 || Kitt Peak || Spacewatch || THM || align=right | 2.1 km || 
|-id=199 bgcolor=#d6d6d6
| 386199 ||  || — || October 7, 2007 || Catalina || CSS || — || align=right | 2.9 km || 
|-id=200 bgcolor=#d6d6d6
| 386200 ||  || — || November 1, 2007 || Kitt Peak || Spacewatch || — || align=right | 3.3 km || 
|}

386201–386300 

|-bgcolor=#d6d6d6
| 386201 ||  || — || November 3, 2007 || Kitt Peak || Spacewatch || EOS || align=right | 2.3 km || 
|-id=202 bgcolor=#d6d6d6
| 386202 ||  || — || November 2, 2007 || Kitt Peak || Spacewatch || — || align=right | 2.9 km || 
|-id=203 bgcolor=#d6d6d6
| 386203 ||  || — || November 2, 2007 || Kitt Peak || Spacewatch || NAE || align=right | 2.7 km || 
|-id=204 bgcolor=#d6d6d6
| 386204 ||  || — || November 13, 2007 || Mount Lemmon || Mount Lemmon Survey || — || align=right | 4.5 km || 
|-id=205 bgcolor=#d6d6d6
| 386205 ||  || — || November 11, 2007 || Catalina || CSS || — || align=right | 5.1 km || 
|-id=206 bgcolor=#d6d6d6
| 386206 ||  || — || November 6, 2007 || Kitt Peak || Spacewatch || — || align=right | 2.0 km || 
|-id=207 bgcolor=#d6d6d6
| 386207 ||  || — || November 8, 2007 || Kitt Peak || Spacewatch || — || align=right | 3.2 km || 
|-id=208 bgcolor=#d6d6d6
| 386208 ||  || — || November 3, 2007 || Socorro || LINEAR || — || align=right | 3.7 km || 
|-id=209 bgcolor=#d6d6d6
| 386209 ||  || — || November 5, 2007 || Kitt Peak || Spacewatch || — || align=right | 3.5 km || 
|-id=210 bgcolor=#d6d6d6
| 386210 ||  || — || November 12, 2007 || Mount Lemmon || Mount Lemmon Survey || EOS || align=right | 1.8 km || 
|-id=211 bgcolor=#d6d6d6
| 386211 ||  || — || November 12, 2007 || Mount Lemmon || Mount Lemmon Survey || — || align=right | 3.1 km || 
|-id=212 bgcolor=#d6d6d6
| 386212 ||  || — || November 12, 2007 || Mount Lemmon || Mount Lemmon Survey || EUP || align=right | 4.5 km || 
|-id=213 bgcolor=#d6d6d6
| 386213 ||  || — || November 16, 2007 || Antares || ARO || THB || align=right | 2.5 km || 
|-id=214 bgcolor=#d6d6d6
| 386214 ||  || — || September 18, 2007 || Mount Lemmon || Mount Lemmon Survey || — || align=right | 3.7 km || 
|-id=215 bgcolor=#d6d6d6
| 386215 ||  || — || November 17, 2007 || Socorro || LINEAR || — || align=right | 5.4 km || 
|-id=216 bgcolor=#d6d6d6
| 386216 ||  || — || November 18, 2007 || Socorro || LINEAR || — || align=right | 3.3 km || 
|-id=217 bgcolor=#d6d6d6
| 386217 ||  || — || November 2, 2007 || Kitt Peak || Spacewatch || — || align=right | 2.0 km || 
|-id=218 bgcolor=#d6d6d6
| 386218 ||  || — || November 20, 2007 || Mount Lemmon || Mount Lemmon Survey || EOS || align=right | 2.4 km || 
|-id=219 bgcolor=#d6d6d6
| 386219 ||  || — || November 19, 2007 || Kitt Peak || Spacewatch || HYG || align=right | 2.4 km || 
|-id=220 bgcolor=#d6d6d6
| 386220 ||  || — || November 18, 2007 || Kitt Peak || Spacewatch || — || align=right | 2.9 km || 
|-id=221 bgcolor=#d6d6d6
| 386221 ||  || — || December 12, 2007 || Socorro || LINEAR || — || align=right | 3.4 km || 
|-id=222 bgcolor=#d6d6d6
| 386222 ||  || — || November 12, 2007 || Mount Lemmon || Mount Lemmon Survey || — || align=right | 4.0 km || 
|-id=223 bgcolor=#d6d6d6
| 386223 ||  || — || December 4, 2007 || Kitt Peak || Spacewatch || — || align=right | 2.9 km || 
|-id=224 bgcolor=#d6d6d6
| 386224 ||  || — || December 18, 2007 || Bergisch Gladbach || W. Bickel || EUP || align=right | 3.6 km || 
|-id=225 bgcolor=#d6d6d6
| 386225 ||  || — || December 17, 2007 || Mount Lemmon || Mount Lemmon Survey || — || align=right | 2.4 km || 
|-id=226 bgcolor=#d6d6d6
| 386226 ||  || — || December 20, 2007 || Kitt Peak || Spacewatch || THM || align=right | 2.0 km || 
|-id=227 bgcolor=#d6d6d6
| 386227 ||  || — || November 3, 2007 || Mount Lemmon || Mount Lemmon Survey || CRO || align=right | 3.1 km || 
|-id=228 bgcolor=#d6d6d6
| 386228 ||  || — || December 30, 2007 || Kitt Peak || Spacewatch || EUP || align=right | 4.1 km || 
|-id=229 bgcolor=#d6d6d6
| 386229 ||  || — || December 5, 2007 || Kitt Peak || Spacewatch || EOS || align=right | 2.2 km || 
|-id=230 bgcolor=#d6d6d6
| 386230 ||  || — || December 30, 2007 || Mount Lemmon || Mount Lemmon Survey || — || align=right | 4.1 km || 
|-id=231 bgcolor=#d6d6d6
| 386231 ||  || — || December 28, 2007 || Kitt Peak || Spacewatch || VER || align=right | 3.6 km || 
|-id=232 bgcolor=#d6d6d6
| 386232 ||  || — || December 31, 2007 || Mount Lemmon || Mount Lemmon Survey || ALA || align=right | 3.4 km || 
|-id=233 bgcolor=#d6d6d6
| 386233 ||  || — || December 18, 2007 || Mount Lemmon || Mount Lemmon Survey || VER || align=right | 2.9 km || 
|-id=234 bgcolor=#d6d6d6
| 386234 ||  || — || November 6, 2007 || Kitt Peak || Spacewatch || — || align=right | 3.2 km || 
|-id=235 bgcolor=#d6d6d6
| 386235 ||  || — || January 10, 2008 || Mount Lemmon || Mount Lemmon Survey || — || align=right | 3.4 km || 
|-id=236 bgcolor=#d6d6d6
| 386236 ||  || — || January 10, 2008 || Kitt Peak || Spacewatch || — || align=right | 2.3 km || 
|-id=237 bgcolor=#d6d6d6
| 386237 ||  || — || January 10, 2008 || Mount Lemmon || Mount Lemmon Survey || VER || align=right | 3.2 km || 
|-id=238 bgcolor=#d6d6d6
| 386238 ||  || — || January 10, 2008 || Kitt Peak || Spacewatch || — || align=right | 4.8 km || 
|-id=239 bgcolor=#d6d6d6
| 386239 ||  || — || January 11, 2008 || Kitt Peak || Spacewatch || — || align=right | 3.1 km || 
|-id=240 bgcolor=#d6d6d6
| 386240 ||  || — || November 12, 2007 || Mount Lemmon || Mount Lemmon Survey || — || align=right | 3.7 km || 
|-id=241 bgcolor=#d6d6d6
| 386241 ||  || — || December 31, 2007 || Kitt Peak || Spacewatch || — || align=right | 3.7 km || 
|-id=242 bgcolor=#d6d6d6
| 386242 ||  || — || January 14, 2008 || Kitt Peak || Spacewatch || — || align=right | 3.2 km || 
|-id=243 bgcolor=#d6d6d6
| 386243 ||  || — || December 15, 2007 || Mount Lemmon || Mount Lemmon Survey || URS || align=right | 3.8 km || 
|-id=244 bgcolor=#d6d6d6
| 386244 ||  || — || January 14, 2008 || Kitt Peak || Spacewatch || LIX || align=right | 4.0 km || 
|-id=245 bgcolor=#d6d6d6
| 386245 ||  || — || January 14, 2008 || Kitt Peak || Spacewatch || — || align=right | 3.7 km || 
|-id=246 bgcolor=#d6d6d6
| 386246 ||  || — || January 14, 2008 || Kitt Peak || Spacewatch || — || align=right | 4.2 km || 
|-id=247 bgcolor=#d6d6d6
| 386247 ||  || — || January 10, 2008 || Socorro || LINEAR || THB || align=right | 2.9 km || 
|-id=248 bgcolor=#d6d6d6
| 386248 ||  || — || January 10, 2008 || Catalina || CSS || — || align=right | 3.4 km || 
|-id=249 bgcolor=#d6d6d6
| 386249 ||  || — || January 19, 2008 || Mount Lemmon || Mount Lemmon Survey || EUP || align=right | 4.3 km || 
|-id=250 bgcolor=#d6d6d6
| 386250 ||  || — || February 2, 2008 || Mount Lemmon || Mount Lemmon Survey || — || align=right | 5.4 km || 
|-id=251 bgcolor=#fefefe
| 386251 ||  || — || February 3, 2008 || Kitt Peak || Spacewatch || — || align=right | 1.2 km || 
|-id=252 bgcolor=#fefefe
| 386252 ||  || — || February 3, 2008 || Kitt Peak || Spacewatch || — || align=right data-sort-value="0.70" | 700 m || 
|-id=253 bgcolor=#d6d6d6
| 386253 ||  || — || November 19, 2007 || Kitt Peak || Spacewatch || VER || align=right | 2.6 km || 
|-id=254 bgcolor=#d6d6d6
| 386254 ||  || — || February 6, 2008 || Catalina || CSS || — || align=right | 3.9 km || 
|-id=255 bgcolor=#E9E9E9
| 386255 ||  || — || February 8, 2008 || Mount Lemmon || Mount Lemmon Survey || — || align=right | 1.3 km || 
|-id=256 bgcolor=#fefefe
| 386256 ||  || — || February 8, 2008 || Kitt Peak || Spacewatch || FLO || align=right data-sort-value="0.65" | 650 m || 
|-id=257 bgcolor=#fefefe
| 386257 ||  || — || January 10, 2008 || Mount Lemmon || Mount Lemmon Survey || MAS || align=right data-sort-value="0.59" | 590 m || 
|-id=258 bgcolor=#d6d6d6
| 386258 ||  || — || February 28, 2008 || Catalina || CSS || THB || align=right | 4.5 km || 
|-id=259 bgcolor=#FFC2E0
| 386259 ||  || — || March 2, 2008 || Siding Spring || SSS || APO +1kmcritical || align=right | 2.7 km || 
|-id=260 bgcolor=#fefefe
| 386260 ||  || — || September 17, 2006 || Kitt Peak || Spacewatch || — || align=right data-sort-value="0.66" | 660 m || 
|-id=261 bgcolor=#fefefe
| 386261 ||  || — || March 29, 2008 || Mount Lemmon || Mount Lemmon Survey || — || align=right data-sort-value="0.82" | 820 m || 
|-id=262 bgcolor=#fefefe
| 386262 ||  || — || March 30, 2008 || Kitt Peak || Spacewatch || FLO || align=right data-sort-value="0.66" | 660 m || 
|-id=263 bgcolor=#fefefe
| 386263 ||  || — || March 29, 2008 || Kitt Peak || Spacewatch || FLO || align=right data-sort-value="0.61" | 610 m || 
|-id=264 bgcolor=#fefefe
| 386264 ||  || — || December 1, 2003 || Kitt Peak || Spacewatch || — || align=right data-sort-value="0.64" | 640 m || 
|-id=265 bgcolor=#fefefe
| 386265 ||  || — || February 12, 2004 || Kitt Peak || Spacewatch || — || align=right data-sort-value="0.72" | 720 m || 
|-id=266 bgcolor=#fefefe
| 386266 ||  || — || April 7, 2008 || Kitt Peak || Spacewatch || V || align=right data-sort-value="0.62" | 620 m || 
|-id=267 bgcolor=#fefefe
| 386267 ||  || — || April 27, 2008 || Mount Lemmon || Mount Lemmon Survey || — || align=right data-sort-value="0.78" | 780 m || 
|-id=268 bgcolor=#fefefe
| 386268 ||  || — || March 31, 2008 || Mount Lemmon || Mount Lemmon Survey || — || align=right data-sort-value="0.79" | 790 m || 
|-id=269 bgcolor=#fefefe
| 386269 ||  || — || May 3, 2008 || Mount Lemmon || Mount Lemmon Survey || FLO || align=right data-sort-value="0.67" | 670 m || 
|-id=270 bgcolor=#fefefe
| 386270 ||  || — || May 3, 2008 || Mount Lemmon || Mount Lemmon Survey || FLO || align=right data-sort-value="0.71" | 710 m || 
|-id=271 bgcolor=#fefefe
| 386271 ||  || — || May 26, 2008 || Kitt Peak || Spacewatch || — || align=right data-sort-value="0.78" | 780 m || 
|-id=272 bgcolor=#fefefe
| 386272 ||  || — || May 29, 2008 || Mount Lemmon || Mount Lemmon Survey || FLO || align=right data-sort-value="0.72" | 720 m || 
|-id=273 bgcolor=#fefefe
| 386273 ||  || — || May 29, 2008 || Kitt Peak || Spacewatch || — || align=right data-sort-value="0.81" | 810 m || 
|-id=274 bgcolor=#fefefe
| 386274 ||  || — || May 26, 2008 || Kitt Peak || Spacewatch || — || align=right data-sort-value="0.73" | 730 m || 
|-id=275 bgcolor=#E9E9E9
| 386275 ||  || — || June 8, 2008 || Kitt Peak || Spacewatch || — || align=right | 1.1 km || 
|-id=276 bgcolor=#E9E9E9
| 386276 ||  || — || July 30, 2008 || Kitt Peak || Spacewatch || — || align=right data-sort-value="0.96" | 960 m || 
|-id=277 bgcolor=#E9E9E9
| 386277 || 2008 QD || — || August 20, 2008 || Piszkéstető || K. Sárneczky || — || align=right | 1.1 km || 
|-id=278 bgcolor=#E9E9E9
| 386278 ||  || — || August 26, 2008 || La Sagra || OAM Obs. || — || align=right | 1.4 km || 
|-id=279 bgcolor=#E9E9E9
| 386279 ||  || — || August 29, 2008 || La Sagra || OAM Obs. || — || align=right | 1.1 km || 
|-id=280 bgcolor=#E9E9E9
| 386280 ||  || — || August 30, 2008 || Dauban || F. Kugel || ADE || align=right | 1.6 km || 
|-id=281 bgcolor=#FFC2E0
| 386281 ||  || — || September 4, 2008 || Kitt Peak || Spacewatch || AMO +1km || align=right data-sort-value="0.96" | 960 m || 
|-id=282 bgcolor=#E9E9E9
| 386282 ||  || — || September 2, 2008 || Kitt Peak || Spacewatch || — || align=right | 2.5 km || 
|-id=283 bgcolor=#E9E9E9
| 386283 ||  || — || September 2, 2008 || Kitt Peak || Spacewatch || — || align=right | 1.1 km || 
|-id=284 bgcolor=#fefefe
| 386284 ||  || — || September 2, 2008 || Kitt Peak || Spacewatch || — || align=right | 1.9 km || 
|-id=285 bgcolor=#fefefe
| 386285 ||  || — || September 2, 2008 || Kitt Peak || Spacewatch || V || align=right data-sort-value="0.78" | 780 m || 
|-id=286 bgcolor=#fefefe
| 386286 ||  || — || December 8, 2005 || Kitt Peak || Spacewatch || — || align=right data-sort-value="0.85" | 850 m || 
|-id=287 bgcolor=#E9E9E9
| 386287 ||  || — || September 4, 2008 || Kitt Peak || Spacewatch || GER || align=right | 1.4 km || 
|-id=288 bgcolor=#fefefe
| 386288 ||  || — || February 17, 2007 || Kitt Peak || Spacewatch || — || align=right data-sort-value="0.89" | 890 m || 
|-id=289 bgcolor=#E9E9E9
| 386289 ||  || — || September 7, 2008 || Mount Lemmon || Mount Lemmon Survey || — || align=right | 2.1 km || 
|-id=290 bgcolor=#E9E9E9
| 386290 ||  || — || September 9, 2008 || Mount Lemmon || Mount Lemmon Survey || — || align=right data-sort-value="0.99" | 990 m || 
|-id=291 bgcolor=#E9E9E9
| 386291 ||  || — || September 9, 2008 || Mount Lemmon || Mount Lemmon Survey || — || align=right | 2.5 km || 
|-id=292 bgcolor=#fefefe
| 386292 ||  || — || September 6, 2008 || Catalina || CSS || NYS || align=right data-sort-value="0.81" | 810 m || 
|-id=293 bgcolor=#E9E9E9
| 386293 ||  || — || September 6, 2008 || Catalina || CSS || BRG || align=right | 1.5 km || 
|-id=294 bgcolor=#E9E9E9
| 386294 ||  || — || September 9, 2008 || Catalina || CSS || — || align=right | 2.1 km || 
|-id=295 bgcolor=#E9E9E9
| 386295 ||  || — || September 9, 2008 || Catalina || CSS || MAR || align=right data-sort-value="0.99" | 990 m || 
|-id=296 bgcolor=#E9E9E9
| 386296 ||  || — || September 21, 2008 || Grove Creek || F. Tozzi || — || align=right | 2.3 km || 
|-id=297 bgcolor=#E9E9E9
| 386297 ||  || — || September 22, 2008 || Socorro || LINEAR || — || align=right | 1.4 km || 
|-id=298 bgcolor=#FFC2E0
| 386298 ||  || — || September 24, 2008 || Catalina || CSS || AMO || align=right data-sort-value="0.35" | 350 m || 
|-id=299 bgcolor=#E9E9E9
| 386299 ||  || — || September 19, 2008 || Kitt Peak || Spacewatch || — || align=right data-sort-value="0.85" | 850 m || 
|-id=300 bgcolor=#E9E9E9
| 386300 ||  || — || September 19, 2008 || Kitt Peak || Spacewatch || NEM || align=right | 1.9 km || 
|}

386301–386400 

|-bgcolor=#E9E9E9
| 386301 ||  || — || September 19, 2008 || Kitt Peak || Spacewatch || — || align=right | 1.8 km || 
|-id=302 bgcolor=#E9E9E9
| 386302 ||  || — || September 4, 2008 || Kitt Peak || Spacewatch || — || align=right | 1.8 km || 
|-id=303 bgcolor=#E9E9E9
| 386303 ||  || — || September 19, 2008 || Kitt Peak || Spacewatch || — || align=right | 3.0 km || 
|-id=304 bgcolor=#fefefe
| 386304 ||  || — || September 20, 2008 || Kitt Peak || Spacewatch || V || align=right data-sort-value="0.96" | 960 m || 
|-id=305 bgcolor=#E9E9E9
| 386305 ||  || — || September 7, 2008 || Mount Lemmon || Mount Lemmon Survey || EUN || align=right | 1.1 km || 
|-id=306 bgcolor=#fefefe
| 386306 ||  || — || September 20, 2008 || Mount Lemmon || Mount Lemmon Survey || MAS || align=right data-sort-value="0.68" | 680 m || 
|-id=307 bgcolor=#E9E9E9
| 386307 ||  || — || September 20, 2008 || Mount Lemmon || Mount Lemmon Survey || — || align=right | 1.3 km || 
|-id=308 bgcolor=#d6d6d6
| 386308 ||  || — || September 20, 2008 || Kitt Peak || Spacewatch || KAR || align=right | 1.2 km || 
|-id=309 bgcolor=#E9E9E9
| 386309 ||  || — || September 20, 2008 || Mount Lemmon || Mount Lemmon Survey || ADE || align=right | 3.7 km || 
|-id=310 bgcolor=#E9E9E9
| 386310 ||  || — || September 20, 2008 || Kitt Peak || Spacewatch || — || align=right | 1.4 km || 
|-id=311 bgcolor=#E9E9E9
| 386311 ||  || — || March 5, 2006 || Kitt Peak || Spacewatch || — || align=right | 1.6 km || 
|-id=312 bgcolor=#E9E9E9
| 386312 ||  || — || September 21, 2008 || Kitt Peak || Spacewatch || — || align=right | 1.1 km || 
|-id=313 bgcolor=#E9E9E9
| 386313 ||  || — || September 7, 2008 || Mount Lemmon || Mount Lemmon Survey || — || align=right | 1.4 km || 
|-id=314 bgcolor=#E9E9E9
| 386314 ||  || — || September 21, 2008 || Mount Lemmon || Mount Lemmon Survey || — || align=right | 1.8 km || 
|-id=315 bgcolor=#E9E9E9
| 386315 ||  || — || September 21, 2008 || Mount Lemmon || Mount Lemmon Survey || AEO || align=right | 1.1 km || 
|-id=316 bgcolor=#E9E9E9
| 386316 ||  || — || September 22, 2008 || Mount Lemmon || Mount Lemmon Survey || HEN || align=right data-sort-value="0.99" | 990 m || 
|-id=317 bgcolor=#E9E9E9
| 386317 ||  || — || September 23, 2008 || Catalina || CSS || — || align=right | 1.6 km || 
|-id=318 bgcolor=#fefefe
| 386318 ||  || — || September 9, 2008 || Kitt Peak || Spacewatch || — || align=right | 1.0 km || 
|-id=319 bgcolor=#E9E9E9
| 386319 ||  || — || September 21, 2008 || Kitt Peak || Spacewatch || — || align=right | 1.7 km || 
|-id=320 bgcolor=#fefefe
| 386320 ||  || — || September 21, 2008 || Kitt Peak || Spacewatch || NYS || align=right data-sort-value="0.83" | 830 m || 
|-id=321 bgcolor=#E9E9E9
| 386321 ||  || — || September 21, 2008 || Kitt Peak || Spacewatch || MIS || align=right | 2.5 km || 
|-id=322 bgcolor=#E9E9E9
| 386322 ||  || — || September 22, 2008 || Kitt Peak || Spacewatch || — || align=right | 1.1 km || 
|-id=323 bgcolor=#E9E9E9
| 386323 ||  || — || September 22, 2008 || Mount Lemmon || Mount Lemmon Survey || — || align=right | 1.9 km || 
|-id=324 bgcolor=#E9E9E9
| 386324 ||  || — || September 22, 2008 || Kitt Peak || Spacewatch || — || align=right | 1.4 km || 
|-id=325 bgcolor=#E9E9E9
| 386325 ||  || — || September 9, 2008 || Catalina || CSS || JUN || align=right | 1.5 km || 
|-id=326 bgcolor=#E9E9E9
| 386326 ||  || — || January 28, 2006 || Mount Lemmon || Mount Lemmon Survey || — || align=right data-sort-value="0.87" | 870 m || 
|-id=327 bgcolor=#E9E9E9
| 386327 ||  || — || September 22, 2008 || Kitt Peak || Spacewatch || RAF || align=right | 1.1 km || 
|-id=328 bgcolor=#E9E9E9
| 386328 ||  || — || September 24, 2008 || Socorro || LINEAR || — || align=right | 1.5 km || 
|-id=329 bgcolor=#E9E9E9
| 386329 ||  || — || September 28, 2008 || Socorro || LINEAR || — || align=right | 2.3 km || 
|-id=330 bgcolor=#E9E9E9
| 386330 ||  || — || September 21, 2008 || Mount Lemmon || Mount Lemmon Survey || — || align=right | 1.2 km || 
|-id=331 bgcolor=#E9E9E9
| 386331 ||  || — || September 25, 2008 || Kitt Peak || Spacewatch || — || align=right | 1.5 km || 
|-id=332 bgcolor=#E9E9E9
| 386332 ||  || — || September 25, 2008 || Kitt Peak || Spacewatch || — || align=right | 1.3 km || 
|-id=333 bgcolor=#E9E9E9
| 386333 ||  || — || September 26, 2008 || Kitt Peak || Spacewatch || — || align=right | 1.0 km || 
|-id=334 bgcolor=#E9E9E9
| 386334 ||  || — || September 27, 2008 || Catalina || CSS || — || align=right | 1.5 km || 
|-id=335 bgcolor=#E9E9E9
| 386335 ||  || — || September 25, 2008 || Mount Lemmon || Mount Lemmon Survey || — || align=right | 1.2 km || 
|-id=336 bgcolor=#E9E9E9
| 386336 ||  || — || September 29, 2008 || Kitt Peak || Spacewatch || — || align=right | 2.2 km || 
|-id=337 bgcolor=#E9E9E9
| 386337 ||  || — || September 24, 2008 || Catalina || CSS || — || align=right | 1.6 km || 
|-id=338 bgcolor=#E9E9E9
| 386338 ||  || — || September 9, 2008 || Catalina || CSS || EUN || align=right | 1.6 km || 
|-id=339 bgcolor=#E9E9E9
| 386339 ||  || — || September 23, 2008 || Catalina || CSS || — || align=right | 1.6 km || 
|-id=340 bgcolor=#E9E9E9
| 386340 ||  || — || September 23, 2008 || Catalina || CSS || — || align=right data-sort-value="0.96" | 960 m || 
|-id=341 bgcolor=#E9E9E9
| 386341 ||  || — || September 28, 2008 || Mount Lemmon || Mount Lemmon Survey || JUN || align=right | 1.0 km || 
|-id=342 bgcolor=#E9E9E9
| 386342 ||  || — || September 21, 2008 || Mount Lemmon || Mount Lemmon Survey || — || align=right | 2.1 km || 
|-id=343 bgcolor=#E9E9E9
| 386343 ||  || — || September 29, 2008 || Catalina || CSS || MAR || align=right | 1.3 km || 
|-id=344 bgcolor=#E9E9E9
| 386344 ||  || — || September 29, 2008 || Mount Lemmon || Mount Lemmon Survey || — || align=right | 3.5 km || 
|-id=345 bgcolor=#E9E9E9
| 386345 ||  || — || September 24, 2008 || Mount Lemmon || Mount Lemmon Survey || — || align=right | 1.6 km || 
|-id=346 bgcolor=#E9E9E9
| 386346 ||  || — || September 24, 2008 || Kitt Peak || Spacewatch || — || align=right | 2.1 km || 
|-id=347 bgcolor=#E9E9E9
| 386347 ||  || — || September 23, 2008 || Kitt Peak || Spacewatch || — || align=right | 1.3 km || 
|-id=348 bgcolor=#d6d6d6
| 386348 ||  || — || September 23, 2008 || Kitt Peak || Spacewatch || — || align=right | 2.4 km || 
|-id=349 bgcolor=#E9E9E9
| 386349 ||  || — || September 28, 2008 || Catalina || CSS || — || align=right | 1.7 km || 
|-id=350 bgcolor=#E9E9E9
| 386350 ||  || — || September 22, 2008 || Kitt Peak || Spacewatch || — || align=right | 1.6 km || 
|-id=351 bgcolor=#E9E9E9
| 386351 ||  || — || September 22, 2008 || Mount Lemmon || Mount Lemmon Survey || — || align=right | 1.9 km || 
|-id=352 bgcolor=#E9E9E9
| 386352 ||  || — || September 24, 2008 || Kitt Peak || Spacewatch || — || align=right | 2.7 km || 
|-id=353 bgcolor=#E9E9E9
| 386353 ||  || — || September 29, 2008 || Mount Lemmon || Mount Lemmon Survey || — || align=right | 1.4 km || 
|-id=354 bgcolor=#E9E9E9
| 386354 ||  || — || October 1, 2008 || La Sagra || OAM Obs. || — || align=right | 2.9 km || 
|-id=355 bgcolor=#E9E9E9
| 386355 ||  || — || October 6, 2008 || Junk Bond || D. Healy || HEN || align=right | 1.1 km || 
|-id=356 bgcolor=#E9E9E9
| 386356 ||  || — || October 2, 2008 || Mount Lemmon || Mount Lemmon Survey || — || align=right | 1.6 km || 
|-id=357 bgcolor=#E9E9E9
| 386357 ||  || — || October 1, 2008 || Mount Lemmon || Mount Lemmon Survey || — || align=right | 1.3 km || 
|-id=358 bgcolor=#E9E9E9
| 386358 ||  || — || October 1, 2008 || Kitt Peak || Spacewatch || — || align=right | 1.4 km || 
|-id=359 bgcolor=#fefefe
| 386359 ||  || — || October 2, 2008 || Kitt Peak || Spacewatch || NYS || align=right data-sort-value="0.73" | 730 m || 
|-id=360 bgcolor=#E9E9E9
| 386360 ||  || — || October 2, 2008 || Kitt Peak || Spacewatch || — || align=right | 1.3 km || 
|-id=361 bgcolor=#fefefe
| 386361 ||  || — || October 3, 2008 || Kitt Peak || Spacewatch || — || align=right | 1.4 km || 
|-id=362 bgcolor=#E9E9E9
| 386362 ||  || — || October 4, 2008 || Catalina || CSS || JUN || align=right | 1.2 km || 
|-id=363 bgcolor=#E9E9E9
| 386363 ||  || — || October 2, 2008 || Catalina || CSS || — || align=right | 1.3 km || 
|-id=364 bgcolor=#E9E9E9
| 386364 ||  || — || October 6, 2008 || Kitt Peak || Spacewatch || — || align=right | 1.4 km || 
|-id=365 bgcolor=#E9E9E9
| 386365 ||  || — || March 4, 2006 || Kitt Peak || Spacewatch || — || align=right | 1.1 km || 
|-id=366 bgcolor=#E9E9E9
| 386366 ||  || — || October 8, 2008 || Mount Lemmon || Mount Lemmon Survey || — || align=right | 1.4 km || 
|-id=367 bgcolor=#E9E9E9
| 386367 ||  || — || October 8, 2008 || Mount Lemmon || Mount Lemmon Survey || — || align=right | 1.2 km || 
|-id=368 bgcolor=#E9E9E9
| 386368 ||  || — || October 8, 2008 || Catalina || CSS || ADE || align=right | 2.0 km || 
|-id=369 bgcolor=#fefefe
| 386369 ||  || — || October 8, 2008 || Mount Lemmon || Mount Lemmon Survey || — || align=right | 1.0 km || 
|-id=370 bgcolor=#E9E9E9
| 386370 ||  || — || October 8, 2008 || Mount Lemmon || Mount Lemmon Survey || — || align=right | 1.4 km || 
|-id=371 bgcolor=#E9E9E9
| 386371 ||  || — || February 4, 2006 || Kitt Peak || Spacewatch || — || align=right | 1.2 km || 
|-id=372 bgcolor=#E9E9E9
| 386372 ||  || — || October 9, 2008 || Mount Lemmon || Mount Lemmon Survey || — || align=right | 1.1 km || 
|-id=373 bgcolor=#E9E9E9
| 386373 ||  || — || October 2, 2008 || Kitt Peak || Spacewatch || — || align=right | 1.2 km || 
|-id=374 bgcolor=#E9E9E9
| 386374 ||  || — || October 7, 2008 || Mount Lemmon || Mount Lemmon Survey || — || align=right | 1.6 km || 
|-id=375 bgcolor=#E9E9E9
| 386375 ||  || — || September 7, 2008 || Mount Lemmon || Mount Lemmon Survey || HOF || align=right | 2.5 km || 
|-id=376 bgcolor=#E9E9E9
| 386376 ||  || — || September 23, 2008 || Catalina || CSS || MAR || align=right | 1.2 km || 
|-id=377 bgcolor=#E9E9E9
| 386377 ||  || — || October 17, 2008 || Kitt Peak || Spacewatch || — || align=right | 2.4 km || 
|-id=378 bgcolor=#E9E9E9
| 386378 ||  || — || October 20, 2008 || Kitt Peak || Spacewatch || — || align=right | 1.3 km || 
|-id=379 bgcolor=#E9E9E9
| 386379 ||  || — || October 20, 2008 || Kitt Peak || Spacewatch || — || align=right | 1.1 km || 
|-id=380 bgcolor=#E9E9E9
| 386380 ||  || — || October 20, 2008 || Kitt Peak || Spacewatch || — || align=right | 1.9 km || 
|-id=381 bgcolor=#E9E9E9
| 386381 ||  || — || September 28, 2008 || Mount Lemmon || Mount Lemmon Survey || — || align=right | 1.7 km || 
|-id=382 bgcolor=#E9E9E9
| 386382 ||  || — || October 21, 2008 || Kitt Peak || Spacewatch || — || align=right | 1.8 km || 
|-id=383 bgcolor=#E9E9E9
| 386383 ||  || — || October 21, 2008 || Kitt Peak || Spacewatch || — || align=right | 1.7 km || 
|-id=384 bgcolor=#E9E9E9
| 386384 ||  || — || October 22, 2008 || Kitt Peak || Spacewatch || — || align=right | 1.2 km || 
|-id=385 bgcolor=#E9E9E9
| 386385 ||  || — || September 23, 2008 || Kitt Peak || Spacewatch || MAR || align=right | 1.1 km || 
|-id=386 bgcolor=#E9E9E9
| 386386 ||  || — || October 21, 2008 || Mount Lemmon || Mount Lemmon Survey || — || align=right | 1.4 km || 
|-id=387 bgcolor=#E9E9E9
| 386387 ||  || — || October 22, 2008 || Kitt Peak || Spacewatch || — || align=right | 2.3 km || 
|-id=388 bgcolor=#E9E9E9
| 386388 ||  || — || October 22, 2008 || Kitt Peak || Spacewatch || — || align=right | 1.7 km || 
|-id=389 bgcolor=#E9E9E9
| 386389 ||  || — || September 22, 2008 || Mount Lemmon || Mount Lemmon Survey || — || align=right | 1.9 km || 
|-id=390 bgcolor=#E9E9E9
| 386390 ||  || — || October 23, 2008 || Kitt Peak || Spacewatch || — || align=right | 1.4 km || 
|-id=391 bgcolor=#E9E9E9
| 386391 ||  || — || October 23, 2008 || Kitt Peak || Spacewatch || — || align=right | 1.2 km || 
|-id=392 bgcolor=#E9E9E9
| 386392 ||  || — || October 23, 2008 || Kitt Peak || Spacewatch || — || align=right | 1.5 km || 
|-id=393 bgcolor=#E9E9E9
| 386393 ||  || — || October 23, 2008 || Kitt Peak || Spacewatch || — || align=right | 1.8 km || 
|-id=394 bgcolor=#E9E9E9
| 386394 ||  || — || October 24, 2008 || Kitt Peak || Spacewatch || — || align=right | 2.1 km || 
|-id=395 bgcolor=#E9E9E9
| 386395 ||  || — || October 24, 2008 || Kitt Peak || Spacewatch || — || align=right | 1.2 km || 
|-id=396 bgcolor=#E9E9E9
| 386396 ||  || — || October 24, 2008 || Kitt Peak || Spacewatch || — || align=right | 1.1 km || 
|-id=397 bgcolor=#d6d6d6
| 386397 ||  || — || September 23, 2008 || Catalina || CSS || BRA || align=right | 1.5 km || 
|-id=398 bgcolor=#E9E9E9
| 386398 ||  || — || October 24, 2008 || Catalina || CSS || — || align=right | 1.5 km || 
|-id=399 bgcolor=#E9E9E9
| 386399 ||  || — || February 16, 2001 || Kitt Peak || Spacewatch || — || align=right | 1.4 km || 
|-id=400 bgcolor=#E9E9E9
| 386400 ||  || — || October 24, 2008 || Mount Lemmon || Mount Lemmon Survey || — || align=right | 1.4 km || 
|}

386401–386500 

|-bgcolor=#E9E9E9
| 386401 ||  || — || October 25, 2008 || Socorro || LINEAR || MIS || align=right | 2.6 km || 
|-id=402 bgcolor=#E9E9E9
| 386402 ||  || — || September 7, 2008 || Mount Lemmon || Mount Lemmon Survey || — || align=right | 1.5 km || 
|-id=403 bgcolor=#E9E9E9
| 386403 ||  || — || October 10, 2008 || Catalina || CSS || — || align=right | 1.6 km || 
|-id=404 bgcolor=#E9E9E9
| 386404 ||  || — || September 29, 2008 || Mount Lemmon || Mount Lemmon Survey || — || align=right | 1.2 km || 
|-id=405 bgcolor=#d6d6d6
| 386405 ||  || — || March 8, 2005 || Mount Lemmon || Mount Lemmon Survey || — || align=right | 3.1 km || 
|-id=406 bgcolor=#E9E9E9
| 386406 ||  || — || September 16, 2003 || Kitt Peak || Spacewatch || HEN || align=right | 1.0 km || 
|-id=407 bgcolor=#E9E9E9
| 386407 ||  || — || September 30, 2008 || Mount Lemmon || Mount Lemmon Survey || — || align=right | 1.5 km || 
|-id=408 bgcolor=#E9E9E9
| 386408 ||  || — || October 26, 2008 || Kitt Peak || Spacewatch || AER || align=right | 1.3 km || 
|-id=409 bgcolor=#E9E9E9
| 386409 ||  || — || October 26, 2008 || Catalina || CSS || EUN || align=right | 1.7 km || 
|-id=410 bgcolor=#E9E9E9
| 386410 ||  || — || October 27, 2008 || Mount Lemmon || Mount Lemmon Survey || — || align=right | 1.3 km || 
|-id=411 bgcolor=#E9E9E9
| 386411 ||  || — || October 27, 2008 || Mount Lemmon || Mount Lemmon Survey || EUN || align=right | 1.6 km || 
|-id=412 bgcolor=#E9E9E9
| 386412 ||  || — || October 28, 2008 || Mount Lemmon || Mount Lemmon Survey || HEN || align=right data-sort-value="0.90" | 900 m || 
|-id=413 bgcolor=#E9E9E9
| 386413 ||  || — || April 8, 2006 || Kitt Peak || Spacewatch || EUN || align=right | 1.1 km || 
|-id=414 bgcolor=#E9E9E9
| 386414 ||  || — || October 29, 2008 || Mount Lemmon || Mount Lemmon Survey || — || align=right | 1.7 km || 
|-id=415 bgcolor=#E9E9E9
| 386415 ||  || — || October 30, 2008 || Kitt Peak || Spacewatch || — || align=right | 1.4 km || 
|-id=416 bgcolor=#d6d6d6
| 386416 ||  || — || October 23, 2008 || Mount Lemmon || Mount Lemmon Survey || HYG || align=right | 2.8 km || 
|-id=417 bgcolor=#E9E9E9
| 386417 ||  || — || October 31, 2008 || Kitt Peak || Spacewatch || — || align=right | 1.5 km || 
|-id=418 bgcolor=#E9E9E9
| 386418 ||  || — || October 31, 2008 || Kitt Peak || Spacewatch || — || align=right | 1.4 km || 
|-id=419 bgcolor=#E9E9E9
| 386419 ||  || — || October 23, 2008 || Kitt Peak || Spacewatch || — || align=right | 1.2 km || 
|-id=420 bgcolor=#E9E9E9
| 386420 ||  || — || October 27, 2008 || Kitt Peak || Spacewatch || MRX || align=right | 1.1 km || 
|-id=421 bgcolor=#E9E9E9
| 386421 ||  || — || October 27, 2008 || Mount Lemmon || Mount Lemmon Survey || — || align=right | 1.8 km || 
|-id=422 bgcolor=#E9E9E9
| 386422 ||  || — || October 27, 2008 || Kitt Peak || Spacewatch || — || align=right | 1.4 km || 
|-id=423 bgcolor=#E9E9E9
| 386423 ||  || — || November 2, 2008 || Socorro || LINEAR || — || align=right | 1.3 km || 
|-id=424 bgcolor=#E9E9E9
| 386424 ||  || — || October 30, 2008 || Kitt Peak || Spacewatch || — || align=right | 1.5 km || 
|-id=425 bgcolor=#E9E9E9
| 386425 ||  || — || November 3, 2008 || Mount Lemmon || Mount Lemmon Survey || — || align=right | 1.5 km || 
|-id=426 bgcolor=#E9E9E9
| 386426 ||  || — || November 3, 2008 || Mount Lemmon || Mount Lemmon Survey || — || align=right | 2.2 km || 
|-id=427 bgcolor=#E9E9E9
| 386427 ||  || — || November 1, 2008 || Kitt Peak || Spacewatch || — || align=right | 1.3 km || 
|-id=428 bgcolor=#E9E9E9
| 386428 ||  || — || October 6, 2008 || Mount Lemmon || Mount Lemmon Survey || — || align=right | 1.5 km || 
|-id=429 bgcolor=#E9E9E9
| 386429 ||  || — || November 1, 2008 || Mount Lemmon || Mount Lemmon Survey || — || align=right | 1.3 km || 
|-id=430 bgcolor=#E9E9E9
| 386430 ||  || — || November 1, 2008 || Mount Lemmon || Mount Lemmon Survey || — || align=right | 1.2 km || 
|-id=431 bgcolor=#E9E9E9
| 386431 ||  || — || November 2, 2008 || Mount Lemmon || Mount Lemmon Survey || — || align=right | 1.4 km || 
|-id=432 bgcolor=#E9E9E9
| 386432 ||  || — || November 2, 2008 || Kitt Peak || Spacewatch || — || align=right | 1.2 km || 
|-id=433 bgcolor=#E9E9E9
| 386433 ||  || — || November 7, 2008 || Catalina || CSS || — || align=right | 2.4 km || 
|-id=434 bgcolor=#E9E9E9
| 386434 ||  || — || November 2, 2008 || Catalina || CSS || — || align=right | 3.2 km || 
|-id=435 bgcolor=#E9E9E9
| 386435 ||  || — || November 1, 2008 || Mount Lemmon || Mount Lemmon Survey || — || align=right | 2.4 km || 
|-id=436 bgcolor=#E9E9E9
| 386436 ||  || — || November 17, 2008 || Kitt Peak || Spacewatch || — || align=right | 1.7 km || 
|-id=437 bgcolor=#E9E9E9
| 386437 ||  || — || November 18, 2008 || Catalina || CSS || MRX || align=right | 1.1 km || 
|-id=438 bgcolor=#E9E9E9
| 386438 ||  || — || November 17, 2008 || Kitt Peak || Spacewatch || — || align=right | 1.7 km || 
|-id=439 bgcolor=#E9E9E9
| 386439 ||  || — || October 31, 2008 || Kitt Peak || Spacewatch || — || align=right | 1.1 km || 
|-id=440 bgcolor=#d6d6d6
| 386440 ||  || — || November 22, 2008 || La Sagra || OAM Obs. || — || align=right | 3.4 km || 
|-id=441 bgcolor=#E9E9E9
| 386441 ||  || — || November 18, 2008 || Kitt Peak || Spacewatch || NEM || align=right | 2.4 km || 
|-id=442 bgcolor=#E9E9E9
| 386442 ||  || — || November 20, 2008 || Kitt Peak || Spacewatch || — || align=right | 2.2 km || 
|-id=443 bgcolor=#d6d6d6
| 386443 ||  || — || November 22, 2008 || La Sagra || OAM Obs. || — || align=right | 2.7 km || 
|-id=444 bgcolor=#E9E9E9
| 386444 ||  || — || November 24, 2008 || Dauban || F. Kugel || — || align=right | 1.5 km || 
|-id=445 bgcolor=#E9E9E9
| 386445 ||  || — || November 21, 2008 || Cerro Burek || Alianza S4 Obs. || MAR || align=right | 1.2 km || 
|-id=446 bgcolor=#E9E9E9
| 386446 ||  || — || November 1, 2008 || Mount Lemmon || Mount Lemmon Survey || PAD || align=right | 1.8 km || 
|-id=447 bgcolor=#d6d6d6
| 386447 ||  || — || November 23, 2008 || Mount Lemmon || Mount Lemmon Survey || — || align=right | 3.3 km || 
|-id=448 bgcolor=#E9E9E9
| 386448 ||  || — || September 29, 2008 || Mount Lemmon || Mount Lemmon Survey || WIT || align=right | 1.3 km || 
|-id=449 bgcolor=#E9E9E9
| 386449 ||  || — || November 20, 2008 || Kitt Peak || Spacewatch || — || align=right | 1.8 km || 
|-id=450 bgcolor=#E9E9E9
| 386450 ||  || — || November 30, 2008 || Kitt Peak || Spacewatch || — || align=right | 1.7 km || 
|-id=451 bgcolor=#E9E9E9
| 386451 ||  || — || November 30, 2008 || Kitt Peak || Spacewatch || — || align=right | 2.5 km || 
|-id=452 bgcolor=#E9E9E9
| 386452 ||  || — || November 23, 2008 || Kitt Peak || Spacewatch || — || align=right | 3.3 km || 
|-id=453 bgcolor=#E9E9E9
| 386453 ||  || — || September 27, 2008 || Mount Lemmon || Mount Lemmon Survey || NEM || align=right | 2.1 km || 
|-id=454 bgcolor=#FFC2E0
| 386454 || 2008 XM || — || December 2, 2008 || Socorro || LINEAR || APOPHAcritical || align=right data-sort-value="0.37" | 370 m || 
|-id=455 bgcolor=#E9E9E9
| 386455 ||  || — || December 4, 2008 || Socorro || LINEAR || POS || align=right | 4.7 km || 
|-id=456 bgcolor=#E9E9E9
| 386456 ||  || — || December 2, 2008 || Kitt Peak || Spacewatch || — || align=right | 1.3 km || 
|-id=457 bgcolor=#E9E9E9
| 386457 ||  || — || December 1, 2008 || Kitt Peak || Spacewatch || — || align=right | 1.5 km || 
|-id=458 bgcolor=#E9E9E9
| 386458 ||  || — || November 19, 2008 || Kitt Peak || Spacewatch || MIS || align=right | 2.1 km || 
|-id=459 bgcolor=#E9E9E9
| 386459 ||  || — || September 24, 2008 || Mount Lemmon || Mount Lemmon Survey || 526 || align=right | 2.4 km || 
|-id=460 bgcolor=#E9E9E9
| 386460 ||  || — || June 15, 2007 || Kitt Peak || Spacewatch || — || align=right | 1.9 km || 
|-id=461 bgcolor=#E9E9E9
| 386461 ||  || — || December 2, 2008 || Kitt Peak || Spacewatch || — || align=right | 2.1 km || 
|-id=462 bgcolor=#d6d6d6
| 386462 ||  || — || December 2, 2008 || Kitt Peak || Spacewatch || — || align=right | 3.0 km || 
|-id=463 bgcolor=#E9E9E9
| 386463 ||  || — || December 23, 2008 || Piszkéstető || K. Sárneczky || — || align=right | 1.7 km || 
|-id=464 bgcolor=#E9E9E9
| 386464 ||  || — || November 2, 2008 || Mount Lemmon || Mount Lemmon Survey || — || align=right | 2.4 km || 
|-id=465 bgcolor=#E9E9E9
| 386465 ||  || — || December 21, 2008 || Mount Lemmon || Mount Lemmon Survey || — || align=right | 2.1 km || 
|-id=466 bgcolor=#d6d6d6
| 386466 ||  || — || December 21, 2008 || Mount Lemmon || Mount Lemmon Survey || — || align=right | 2.4 km || 
|-id=467 bgcolor=#E9E9E9
| 386467 ||  || — || December 19, 2008 || La Sagra || OAM Obs. || — || align=right | 3.2 km || 
|-id=468 bgcolor=#E9E9E9
| 386468 ||  || — || November 19, 2008 || Kitt Peak || Spacewatch || — || align=right | 2.9 km || 
|-id=469 bgcolor=#d6d6d6
| 386469 ||  || — || December 29, 2008 || Mount Lemmon || Mount Lemmon Survey || — || align=right | 2.7 km || 
|-id=470 bgcolor=#d6d6d6
| 386470 ||  || — || December 29, 2008 || Mount Lemmon || Mount Lemmon Survey || — || align=right | 3.3 km || 
|-id=471 bgcolor=#d6d6d6
| 386471 ||  || — || December 30, 2008 || Mount Lemmon || Mount Lemmon Survey || — || align=right | 2.6 km || 
|-id=472 bgcolor=#d6d6d6
| 386472 ||  || — || December 21, 2008 || Mount Lemmon || Mount Lemmon Survey || KOR || align=right | 1.5 km || 
|-id=473 bgcolor=#E9E9E9
| 386473 ||  || — || December 21, 2008 || Kitt Peak || Spacewatch || MRX || align=right | 1.2 km || 
|-id=474 bgcolor=#d6d6d6
| 386474 ||  || — || December 29, 2008 || Kitt Peak || Spacewatch || KOR || align=right | 1.4 km || 
|-id=475 bgcolor=#E9E9E9
| 386475 ||  || — || December 22, 2008 || Kitt Peak || Spacewatch || — || align=right | 2.1 km || 
|-id=476 bgcolor=#d6d6d6
| 386476 ||  || — || December 29, 2008 || Kitt Peak || Spacewatch || — || align=right | 2.2 km || 
|-id=477 bgcolor=#d6d6d6
| 386477 ||  || — || December 29, 2008 || Kitt Peak || Spacewatch || CHA || align=right | 2.1 km || 
|-id=478 bgcolor=#d6d6d6
| 386478 ||  || — || September 10, 2007 || Kitt Peak || Spacewatch || KOR || align=right | 1.1 km || 
|-id=479 bgcolor=#d6d6d6
| 386479 ||  || — || December 30, 2008 || Kitt Peak || Spacewatch || — || align=right | 3.9 km || 
|-id=480 bgcolor=#d6d6d6
| 386480 ||  || — || December 30, 2008 || Mount Lemmon || Mount Lemmon Survey || — || align=right | 3.5 km || 
|-id=481 bgcolor=#E9E9E9
| 386481 ||  || — || December 29, 2008 || Mount Lemmon || Mount Lemmon Survey || — || align=right | 2.2 km || 
|-id=482 bgcolor=#d6d6d6
| 386482 ||  || — || December 30, 2008 || La Sagra || OAM Obs. || — || align=right | 3.6 km || 
|-id=483 bgcolor=#d6d6d6
| 386483 ||  || — || December 29, 2008 || Kitt Peak || Spacewatch || BRA || align=right | 1.5 km || 
|-id=484 bgcolor=#d6d6d6
| 386484 ||  || — || December 30, 2008 || Mount Lemmon || Mount Lemmon Survey || — || align=right | 2.7 km || 
|-id=485 bgcolor=#E9E9E9
| 386485 ||  || — || January 15, 2009 || Kitt Peak || Spacewatch || HNA || align=right | 2.9 km || 
|-id=486 bgcolor=#E9E9E9
| 386486 ||  || — || January 15, 2009 || Kitt Peak || Spacewatch || HOF || align=right | 2.5 km || 
|-id=487 bgcolor=#d6d6d6
| 386487 ||  || — || January 15, 2009 || Kitt Peak || Spacewatch || — || align=right | 2.6 km || 
|-id=488 bgcolor=#d6d6d6
| 386488 ||  || — || January 3, 2009 || Mount Lemmon || Mount Lemmon Survey || — || align=right | 2.4 km || 
|-id=489 bgcolor=#d6d6d6
| 386489 ||  || — || January 3, 2009 || Mount Lemmon || Mount Lemmon Survey || — || align=right | 3.8 km || 
|-id=490 bgcolor=#E9E9E9
| 386490 ||  || — || March 4, 2000 || Socorro || LINEAR || — || align=right | 3.5 km || 
|-id=491 bgcolor=#d6d6d6
| 386491 ||  || — || January 19, 2009 || Mayhill || A. Lowe || — || align=right | 3.1 km || 
|-id=492 bgcolor=#d6d6d6
| 386492 ||  || — || January 16, 2009 || Kitt Peak || Spacewatch || — || align=right | 2.6 km || 
|-id=493 bgcolor=#d6d6d6
| 386493 ||  || — || January 2, 2009 || Mount Lemmon || Mount Lemmon Survey || — || align=right | 2.0 km || 
|-id=494 bgcolor=#d6d6d6
| 386494 ||  || — || December 30, 2008 || Mount Lemmon || Mount Lemmon Survey || — || align=right | 2.9 km || 
|-id=495 bgcolor=#d6d6d6
| 386495 ||  || — || January 16, 2009 || Kitt Peak || Spacewatch || KOR || align=right | 1.3 km || 
|-id=496 bgcolor=#d6d6d6
| 386496 ||  || — || January 16, 2009 || Kitt Peak || Spacewatch || EUP || align=right | 5.7 km || 
|-id=497 bgcolor=#d6d6d6
| 386497 ||  || — || January 16, 2009 || Kitt Peak || Spacewatch || — || align=right | 4.4 km || 
|-id=498 bgcolor=#d6d6d6
| 386498 ||  || — || January 16, 2009 || Kitt Peak || Spacewatch || CHA || align=right | 2.4 km || 
|-id=499 bgcolor=#d6d6d6
| 386499 ||  || — || January 16, 2009 || Kitt Peak || Spacewatch || — || align=right | 2.8 km || 
|-id=500 bgcolor=#d6d6d6
| 386500 ||  || — || January 16, 2009 || Kitt Peak || Spacewatch || HYG || align=right | 2.6 km || 
|}

386501–386600 

|-bgcolor=#d6d6d6
| 386501 ||  || — || January 16, 2009 || Kitt Peak || Spacewatch || HIL3:2 || align=right | 6.7 km || 
|-id=502 bgcolor=#d6d6d6
| 386502 ||  || — || January 16, 2009 || Kitt Peak || Spacewatch || — || align=right | 3.4 km || 
|-id=503 bgcolor=#d6d6d6
| 386503 ||  || — || January 17, 2009 || Kitt Peak || Spacewatch || — || align=right | 2.3 km || 
|-id=504 bgcolor=#FFC2E0
| 386504 ||  || — || January 29, 2009 || Catalina || CSS || APO || align=right data-sort-value="0.64" | 640 m || 
|-id=505 bgcolor=#d6d6d6
| 386505 ||  || — || January 17, 2009 || Mount Lemmon || Mount Lemmon Survey || — || align=right | 3.0 km || 
|-id=506 bgcolor=#d6d6d6
| 386506 ||  || — || January 25, 2009 || Socorro || LINEAR || — || align=right | 2.7 km || 
|-id=507 bgcolor=#d6d6d6
| 386507 ||  || — || January 25, 2009 || Kitt Peak || Spacewatch || KOR || align=right | 1.4 km || 
|-id=508 bgcolor=#d6d6d6
| 386508 ||  || — || January 25, 2009 || Kitt Peak || Spacewatch || — || align=right | 3.6 km || 
|-id=509 bgcolor=#d6d6d6
| 386509 ||  || — || October 2, 2006 || Mount Lemmon || Mount Lemmon Survey || — || align=right | 2.7 km || 
|-id=510 bgcolor=#d6d6d6
| 386510 ||  || — || January 30, 2009 || Mount Lemmon || Mount Lemmon Survey || — || align=right | 2.4 km || 
|-id=511 bgcolor=#d6d6d6
| 386511 ||  || — || November 24, 2008 || Mount Lemmon || Mount Lemmon Survey || — || align=right | 3.6 km || 
|-id=512 bgcolor=#d6d6d6
| 386512 ||  || — || January 24, 2009 || Cerro Burek || Alianza S4 Obs. || — || align=right | 3.5 km || 
|-id=513 bgcolor=#d6d6d6
| 386513 ||  || — || December 22, 2008 || Kitt Peak || Spacewatch || KOR || align=right | 1.5 km || 
|-id=514 bgcolor=#d6d6d6
| 386514 ||  || — || December 31, 2008 || Kitt Peak || Spacewatch || CHA || align=right | 2.1 km || 
|-id=515 bgcolor=#d6d6d6
| 386515 ||  || — || December 22, 2008 || Mount Lemmon || Mount Lemmon Survey || — || align=right | 2.9 km || 
|-id=516 bgcolor=#d6d6d6
| 386516 ||  || — || January 30, 2009 || Mount Lemmon || Mount Lemmon Survey || EOS || align=right | 1.8 km || 
|-id=517 bgcolor=#d6d6d6
| 386517 ||  || — || January 31, 2009 || Mount Lemmon || Mount Lemmon Survey || — || align=right | 2.4 km || 
|-id=518 bgcolor=#d6d6d6
| 386518 ||  || — || January 15, 2009 || Kitt Peak || Spacewatch || EOS || align=right | 1.6 km || 
|-id=519 bgcolor=#d6d6d6
| 386519 ||  || — || January 29, 2009 || Kitt Peak || Spacewatch || — || align=right | 1.6 km || 
|-id=520 bgcolor=#d6d6d6
| 386520 ||  || — || January 3, 2009 || Mount Lemmon || Mount Lemmon Survey || — || align=right | 2.8 km || 
|-id=521 bgcolor=#d6d6d6
| 386521 ||  || — || January 31, 2009 || Kitt Peak || Spacewatch || — || align=right | 2.9 km || 
|-id=522 bgcolor=#d6d6d6
| 386522 ||  || — || January 20, 2009 || Kitt Peak || Spacewatch || — || align=right | 2.2 km || 
|-id=523 bgcolor=#d6d6d6
| 386523 ||  || — || January 3, 2009 || Mount Lemmon || Mount Lemmon Survey || — || align=right | 3.0 km || 
|-id=524 bgcolor=#d6d6d6
| 386524 ||  || — || January 24, 2009 || Cerro Burek || Alianza S4 Obs. || — || align=right | 3.8 km || 
|-id=525 bgcolor=#d6d6d6
| 386525 ||  || — || January 25, 2009 || Kitt Peak || Spacewatch || — || align=right | 3.2 km || 
|-id=526 bgcolor=#d6d6d6
| 386526 ||  || — || January 25, 2009 || Catalina || CSS || — || align=right | 3.7 km || 
|-id=527 bgcolor=#fefefe
| 386527 ||  || — || January 18, 2009 || Socorro || LINEAR || H || align=right data-sort-value="0.70" | 700 m || 
|-id=528 bgcolor=#d6d6d6
| 386528 ||  || — || February 12, 2009 || Calar Alto || F. Hormuth || CHA || align=right | 1.9 km || 
|-id=529 bgcolor=#E9E9E9
| 386529 ||  || — || February 1, 2009 || Kitt Peak || Spacewatch || AGN || align=right | 1.2 km || 
|-id=530 bgcolor=#d6d6d6
| 386530 ||  || — || January 18, 2009 || Kitt Peak || Spacewatch || — || align=right | 2.3 km || 
|-id=531 bgcolor=#d6d6d6
| 386531 ||  || — || January 18, 2009 || Kitt Peak || Spacewatch || NAE || align=right | 2.2 km || 
|-id=532 bgcolor=#d6d6d6
| 386532 ||  || — || February 1, 2009 || Mount Lemmon || Mount Lemmon Survey || — || align=right | 2.5 km || 
|-id=533 bgcolor=#d6d6d6
| 386533 ||  || — || February 1, 2009 || Kitt Peak || Spacewatch || — || align=right | 2.9 km || 
|-id=534 bgcolor=#d6d6d6
| 386534 ||  || — || February 2, 2009 || Mount Lemmon || Mount Lemmon Survey || — || align=right | 2.5 km || 
|-id=535 bgcolor=#d6d6d6
| 386535 ||  || — || February 13, 2009 || Kitt Peak || Spacewatch || EOS || align=right | 2.5 km || 
|-id=536 bgcolor=#d6d6d6
| 386536 ||  || — || February 14, 2009 || Kitt Peak || Spacewatch || — || align=right | 2.1 km || 
|-id=537 bgcolor=#d6d6d6
| 386537 ||  || — || February 14, 2009 || Mount Lemmon || Mount Lemmon Survey || — || align=right | 1.9 km || 
|-id=538 bgcolor=#d6d6d6
| 386538 ||  || — || February 4, 2009 || Mount Lemmon || Mount Lemmon Survey || EUP || align=right | 3.1 km || 
|-id=539 bgcolor=#d6d6d6
| 386539 ||  || — || February 2, 2009 || Catalina || CSS || — || align=right | 5.0 km || 
|-id=540 bgcolor=#d6d6d6
| 386540 ||  || — || February 3, 2009 || Mount Lemmon || Mount Lemmon Survey || URS || align=right | 4.3 km || 
|-id=541 bgcolor=#d6d6d6
| 386541 ||  || — || February 3, 2009 || Mount Lemmon || Mount Lemmon Survey || — || align=right | 3.4 km || 
|-id=542 bgcolor=#d6d6d6
| 386542 ||  || — || February 5, 2009 || Mount Lemmon || Mount Lemmon Survey || — || align=right | 3.2 km || 
|-id=543 bgcolor=#E9E9E9
| 386543 ||  || — || February 17, 2009 || Calar Alto || F. Hormuth || — || align=right | 2.0 km || 
|-id=544 bgcolor=#d6d6d6
| 386544 ||  || — || February 18, 2009 || Socorro || LINEAR || EUP || align=right | 5.0 km || 
|-id=545 bgcolor=#d6d6d6
| 386545 ||  || — || November 22, 2008 || Kitt Peak || Spacewatch || — || align=right | 4.3 km || 
|-id=546 bgcolor=#d6d6d6
| 386546 ||  || — || February 18, 2009 || Bergisch Gladbac || W. Bickel || — || align=right | 3.4 km || 
|-id=547 bgcolor=#d6d6d6
| 386547 ||  || — || February 19, 2009 || Mount Lemmon || Mount Lemmon Survey || — || align=right | 3.2 km || 
|-id=548 bgcolor=#d6d6d6
| 386548 ||  || — || February 17, 2009 || La Sagra || OAM Obs. || TRE || align=right | 3.2 km || 
|-id=549 bgcolor=#d6d6d6
| 386549 ||  || — || January 30, 2009 || Mount Lemmon || Mount Lemmon Survey || THB || align=right | 3.1 km || 
|-id=550 bgcolor=#d6d6d6
| 386550 ||  || — || February 20, 2009 || Kitt Peak || Spacewatch || — || align=right | 3.2 km || 
|-id=551 bgcolor=#d6d6d6
| 386551 ||  || — || January 16, 2009 || Kitt Peak || Spacewatch || — || align=right | 3.4 km || 
|-id=552 bgcolor=#d6d6d6
| 386552 ||  || — || January 25, 1998 || Kitt Peak || Spacewatch || — || align=right | 3.6 km || 
|-id=553 bgcolor=#d6d6d6
| 386553 ||  || — || February 19, 2009 || Kitt Peak || Spacewatch || THM || align=right | 2.6 km || 
|-id=554 bgcolor=#d6d6d6
| 386554 ||  || — || February 5, 2009 || Kitt Peak || Spacewatch || EUP || align=right | 3.0 km || 
|-id=555 bgcolor=#d6d6d6
| 386555 ||  || — || February 22, 2009 || Kitt Peak || Spacewatch || — || align=right | 3.5 km || 
|-id=556 bgcolor=#d6d6d6
| 386556 ||  || — || February 22, 2009 || Kitt Peak || Spacewatch || — || align=right | 2.2 km || 
|-id=557 bgcolor=#d6d6d6
| 386557 ||  || — || February 22, 2009 || Mount Lemmon || Mount Lemmon Survey || — || align=right | 3.6 km || 
|-id=558 bgcolor=#d6d6d6
| 386558 ||  || — || February 24, 2009 || Mount Lemmon || Mount Lemmon Survey || KOR || align=right | 1.5 km || 
|-id=559 bgcolor=#d6d6d6
| 386559 ||  || — || April 19, 2004 || Kitt Peak || Spacewatch || — || align=right | 3.0 km || 
|-id=560 bgcolor=#d6d6d6
| 386560 ||  || — || December 30, 2008 || Mount Lemmon || Mount Lemmon Survey || EOS || align=right | 1.8 km || 
|-id=561 bgcolor=#d6d6d6
| 386561 ||  || — || January 31, 2009 || Kitt Peak || Spacewatch || — || align=right | 3.3 km || 
|-id=562 bgcolor=#d6d6d6
| 386562 ||  || — || February 27, 2009 || Kitt Peak || Spacewatch || KOR || align=right | 1.7 km || 
|-id=563 bgcolor=#d6d6d6
| 386563 ||  || — || February 14, 2009 || Kitt Peak || Spacewatch || ALA || align=right | 3.3 km || 
|-id=564 bgcolor=#d6d6d6
| 386564 ||  || — || February 3, 2009 || Kitt Peak || Spacewatch || — || align=right | 2.7 km || 
|-id=565 bgcolor=#d6d6d6
| 386565 ||  || — || October 16, 2006 || Catalina || CSS || — || align=right | 3.4 km || 
|-id=566 bgcolor=#d6d6d6
| 386566 ||  || — || February 13, 2009 || Kitt Peak || Spacewatch || — || align=right | 3.4 km || 
|-id=567 bgcolor=#d6d6d6
| 386567 ||  || — || August 29, 2006 || Kitt Peak || Spacewatch || — || align=right | 2.7 km || 
|-id=568 bgcolor=#d6d6d6
| 386568 ||  || — || February 27, 2009 || Kitt Peak || Spacewatch || EOS || align=right | 2.2 km || 
|-id=569 bgcolor=#d6d6d6
| 386569 ||  || — || February 27, 2009 || Kitt Peak || Spacewatch || — || align=right | 2.9 km || 
|-id=570 bgcolor=#d6d6d6
| 386570 ||  || — || February 26, 2009 || Kitt Peak || Spacewatch || — || align=right | 2.8 km || 
|-id=571 bgcolor=#d6d6d6
| 386571 ||  || — || February 27, 2009 || Kitt Peak || Spacewatch || — || align=right | 2.4 km || 
|-id=572 bgcolor=#d6d6d6
| 386572 ||  || — || February 27, 2009 || Kitt Peak || Spacewatch || — || align=right | 2.8 km || 
|-id=573 bgcolor=#d6d6d6
| 386573 ||  || — || February 20, 2009 || Kitt Peak || Spacewatch || — || align=right | 2.8 km || 
|-id=574 bgcolor=#d6d6d6
| 386574 ||  || — || February 20, 2009 || Kitt Peak || Spacewatch || THM || align=right | 2.4 km || 
|-id=575 bgcolor=#d6d6d6
| 386575 ||  || — || February 19, 2009 || Kitt Peak || Spacewatch || — || align=right | 2.6 km || 
|-id=576 bgcolor=#d6d6d6
| 386576 ||  || — || February 19, 2009 || Kitt Peak || Spacewatch || — || align=right | 2.3 km || 
|-id=577 bgcolor=#d6d6d6
| 386577 ||  || — || February 27, 2009 || Kitt Peak || Spacewatch || — || align=right | 3.1 km || 
|-id=578 bgcolor=#d6d6d6
| 386578 ||  || — || March 1, 2009 || Kitt Peak || Spacewatch || — || align=right | 3.2 km || 
|-id=579 bgcolor=#d6d6d6
| 386579 ||  || — || February 2, 2009 || Mount Lemmon || Mount Lemmon Survey || EOS || align=right | 2.4 km || 
|-id=580 bgcolor=#d6d6d6
| 386580 ||  || — || March 15, 2009 || Kitt Peak || Spacewatch || — || align=right | 2.8 km || 
|-id=581 bgcolor=#d6d6d6
| 386581 ||  || — || March 15, 2009 || Kitt Peak || Spacewatch || EOS || align=right | 1.6 km || 
|-id=582 bgcolor=#d6d6d6
| 386582 ||  || — || March 20, 2009 || La Sagra || OAM Obs. || — || align=right | 2.5 km || 
|-id=583 bgcolor=#d6d6d6
| 386583 ||  || — || March 19, 2009 || Bergisch Gladbac || W. Bickel || — || align=right | 3.0 km || 
|-id=584 bgcolor=#d6d6d6
| 386584 ||  || — || March 19, 2009 || Mount Lemmon || Mount Lemmon Survey || EOS || align=right | 2.2 km || 
|-id=585 bgcolor=#d6d6d6
| 386585 ||  || — || March 23, 2009 || Hibiscus || N. Teamo || — || align=right | 2.8 km || 
|-id=586 bgcolor=#d6d6d6
| 386586 ||  || — || March 25, 2009 || Hibiscus || N. Teamo || — || align=right | 2.9 km || 
|-id=587 bgcolor=#fefefe
| 386587 ||  || — || March 19, 2009 || Catalina || CSS || H || align=right data-sort-value="0.72" | 720 m || 
|-id=588 bgcolor=#d6d6d6
| 386588 ||  || — || March 1, 2009 || Mount Lemmon || Mount Lemmon Survey || — || align=right | 2.6 km || 
|-id=589 bgcolor=#d6d6d6
| 386589 ||  || — || March 24, 2009 || Mount Lemmon || Mount Lemmon Survey || — || align=right | 3.0 km || 
|-id=590 bgcolor=#d6d6d6
| 386590 ||  || — || March 27, 2009 || Catalina || CSS || — || align=right | 4.2 km || 
|-id=591 bgcolor=#d6d6d6
| 386591 ||  || — || March 28, 2009 || Mount Lemmon || Mount Lemmon Survey || — || align=right | 4.5 km || 
|-id=592 bgcolor=#fefefe
| 386592 ||  || — || March 29, 2009 || Mount Lemmon || Mount Lemmon Survey || H || align=right data-sort-value="0.66" | 660 m || 
|-id=593 bgcolor=#d6d6d6
| 386593 ||  || — || March 22, 2009 || Catalina || CSS || EUP || align=right | 3.4 km || 
|-id=594 bgcolor=#fefefe
| 386594 ||  || — || March 23, 2009 || Siding Spring || SSS || H || align=right data-sort-value="0.75" | 750 m || 
|-id=595 bgcolor=#d6d6d6
| 386595 ||  || — || March 25, 2009 || Siding Spring || SSS || EUP || align=right | 4.4 km || 
|-id=596 bgcolor=#d6d6d6
| 386596 ||  || — || March 21, 2009 || Kitt Peak || Spacewatch || — || align=right | 4.2 km || 
|-id=597 bgcolor=#d6d6d6
| 386597 ||  || — || March 27, 2009 || Siding Spring || SSS || — || align=right | 3.9 km || 
|-id=598 bgcolor=#d6d6d6
| 386598 ||  || — || March 18, 2009 || Catalina || CSS || — || align=right | 3.4 km || 
|-id=599 bgcolor=#d6d6d6
| 386599 ||  || — || March 19, 2009 || Mount Lemmon || Mount Lemmon Survey || — || align=right | 2.9 km || 
|-id=600 bgcolor=#d6d6d6
| 386600 ||  || — || March 16, 2009 || Catalina || CSS || EUP || align=right | 3.1 km || 
|}

386601–386700 

|-bgcolor=#d6d6d6
| 386601 ||  || — || March 18, 2009 || Kitt Peak || Spacewatch || — || align=right | 3.6 km || 
|-id=602 bgcolor=#d6d6d6
| 386602 ||  || — || March 19, 2009 || Kitt Peak || Spacewatch || THM || align=right | 2.1 km || 
|-id=603 bgcolor=#d6d6d6
| 386603 ||  || — || March 19, 2009 || Mount Lemmon || Mount Lemmon Survey || — || align=right | 2.5 km || 
|-id=604 bgcolor=#d6d6d6
| 386604 ||  || — || April 2, 2009 || Mount Lemmon || Mount Lemmon Survey || — || align=right | 3.3 km || 
|-id=605 bgcolor=#d6d6d6
| 386605 ||  || — || April 17, 2009 || Kitt Peak || Spacewatch || — || align=right | 3.4 km || 
|-id=606 bgcolor=#d6d6d6
| 386606 ||  || — || April 18, 2009 || Catalina || CSS || — || align=right | 3.1 km || 
|-id=607 bgcolor=#d6d6d6
| 386607 ||  || — || April 19, 2009 || Kitt Peak || Spacewatch || — || align=right | 3.7 km || 
|-id=608 bgcolor=#d6d6d6
| 386608 ||  || — || April 20, 2009 || La Sagra || OAM Obs. || TIR || align=right | 3.1 km || 
|-id=609 bgcolor=#fefefe
| 386609 ||  || — || April 27, 2009 || Siding Spring || SSS || H || align=right data-sort-value="0.64" | 640 m || 
|-id=610 bgcolor=#d6d6d6
| 386610 ||  || — || March 18, 2009 || Kitt Peak || Spacewatch || — || align=right | 2.4 km || 
|-id=611 bgcolor=#d6d6d6
| 386611 ||  || — || April 17, 2009 || Kitt Peak || Spacewatch || — || align=right | 4.2 km || 
|-id=612 bgcolor=#d6d6d6
| 386612 ||  || — || April 27, 2009 || Kitt Peak || Spacewatch || HYG || align=right | 3.1 km || 
|-id=613 bgcolor=#fefefe
| 386613 ||  || — || May 1, 2009 || Mount Lemmon || Mount Lemmon Survey || — || align=right data-sort-value="0.83" | 830 m || 
|-id=614 bgcolor=#fefefe
| 386614 ||  || — || July 28, 2009 || Kitt Peak || Spacewatch || FLO || align=right data-sort-value="0.58" | 580 m || 
|-id=615 bgcolor=#fefefe
| 386615 ||  || — || August 18, 2009 || Wildberg || R. Apitzsch || — || align=right data-sort-value="0.71" | 710 m || 
|-id=616 bgcolor=#fefefe
| 386616 ||  || — || August 20, 2009 || Taunus || S. Karge, U. Zimmer || FLO || align=right data-sort-value="0.64" | 640 m || 
|-id=617 bgcolor=#fefefe
| 386617 ||  || — || August 17, 2009 || Kitt Peak || Spacewatch || — || align=right data-sort-value="0.80" | 800 m || 
|-id=618 bgcolor=#fefefe
| 386618 ||  || — || September 13, 2009 || ESA OGS || ESA OGS || FLO || align=right | 1.4 km || 
|-id=619 bgcolor=#fefefe
| 386619 ||  || — || September 15, 2009 || Kitt Peak || Spacewatch || MAS || align=right data-sort-value="0.69" | 690 m || 
|-id=620 bgcolor=#C2FFFF
| 386620 ||  || — || September 6, 2008 || Catalina || CSS || L4 || align=right | 9.1 km || 
|-id=621 bgcolor=#FA8072
| 386621 ||  || — || September 15, 2009 || Kitt Peak || Spacewatch || — || align=right data-sort-value="0.85" | 850 m || 
|-id=622 bgcolor=#fefefe
| 386622 New Zealand ||  ||  || September 16, 2009 || Farm Cove || J. McCormick || FLO || align=right data-sort-value="0.60" | 600 m || 
|-id=623 bgcolor=#fefefe
| 386623 ||  || — || September 16, 2009 || Kitt Peak || Spacewatch || — || align=right data-sort-value="0.67" | 670 m || 
|-id=624 bgcolor=#fefefe
| 386624 ||  || — || September 16, 2009 || Kitt Peak || Spacewatch || — || align=right data-sort-value="0.68" | 680 m || 
|-id=625 bgcolor=#E9E9E9
| 386625 ||  || — || September 16, 2009 || Kitt Peak || Spacewatch || — || align=right | 1.1 km || 
|-id=626 bgcolor=#fefefe
| 386626 ||  || — || September 16, 2009 || Kitt Peak || Spacewatch || FLO || align=right data-sort-value="0.70" | 700 m || 
|-id=627 bgcolor=#C2FFFF
| 386627 ||  || — || September 17, 2009 || Kitt Peak || Spacewatch || L4 || align=right | 11 km || 
|-id=628 bgcolor=#fefefe
| 386628 ||  || — || September 17, 2009 || Kitt Peak || Spacewatch || — || align=right data-sort-value="0.82" | 820 m || 
|-id=629 bgcolor=#E9E9E9
| 386629 ||  || — || September 18, 2009 || Kitt Peak || Spacewatch || — || align=right | 2.2 km || 
|-id=630 bgcolor=#fefefe
| 386630 ||  || — || November 17, 2006 || Mount Lemmon || Mount Lemmon Survey || ERI || align=right | 1.4 km || 
|-id=631 bgcolor=#fefefe
| 386631 ||  || — || December 13, 2006 || Kitt Peak || Spacewatch || FLO || align=right data-sort-value="0.55" | 550 m || 
|-id=632 bgcolor=#fefefe
| 386632 ||  || — || September 16, 2009 || Mount Lemmon || Mount Lemmon Survey || — || align=right | 1.8 km || 
|-id=633 bgcolor=#C2FFFF
| 386633 ||  || — || August 21, 2008 || Kitt Peak || Spacewatch || L4 || align=right | 10 km || 
|-id=634 bgcolor=#fefefe
| 386634 ||  || — || September 26, 2009 || Modra || Š. Gajdoš, J. Világi || — || align=right data-sort-value="0.65" | 650 m || 
|-id=635 bgcolor=#fefefe
| 386635 ||  || — || September 21, 2009 || Kitt Peak || Spacewatch || — || align=right data-sort-value="0.86" | 860 m || 
|-id=636 bgcolor=#fefefe
| 386636 ||  || — || September 22, 2009 || Kitt Peak || Spacewatch || FLO || align=right | 1.3 km || 
|-id=637 bgcolor=#fefefe
| 386637 ||  || — || September 23, 2009 || Kitt Peak || Spacewatch || FLO || align=right data-sort-value="0.66" | 660 m || 
|-id=638 bgcolor=#fefefe
| 386638 ||  || — || September 23, 2009 || Kitt Peak || Spacewatch || — || align=right | 1.0 km || 
|-id=639 bgcolor=#E9E9E9
| 386639 ||  || — || September 18, 2009 || Catalina || CSS || — || align=right | 1.4 km || 
|-id=640 bgcolor=#C2FFFF
| 386640 ||  || — || September 17, 2009 || Kitt Peak || Spacewatch || L4 || align=right | 8.7 km || 
|-id=641 bgcolor=#fefefe
| 386641 ||  || — || September 19, 2009 || Kitt Peak || Spacewatch || — || align=right data-sort-value="0.98" | 980 m || 
|-id=642 bgcolor=#fefefe
| 386642 ||  || — || September 25, 2009 || Kitt Peak || Spacewatch || — || align=right data-sort-value="0.94" | 940 m || 
|-id=643 bgcolor=#fefefe
| 386643 ||  || — || December 22, 2003 || Kitt Peak || Spacewatch || — || align=right data-sort-value="0.64" | 640 m || 
|-id=644 bgcolor=#fefefe
| 386644 ||  || — || August 29, 2005 || Kitt Peak || Spacewatch || SUL || align=right | 2.0 km || 
|-id=645 bgcolor=#C2FFFF
| 386645 ||  || — || September 23, 2009 || Mount Lemmon || Mount Lemmon Survey || L4 || align=right | 8.3 km || 
|-id=646 bgcolor=#fefefe
| 386646 ||  || — || September 24, 2009 || Kitt Peak || Spacewatch || — || align=right data-sort-value="0.92" | 920 m || 
|-id=647 bgcolor=#fefefe
| 386647 ||  || — || September 17, 2009 || Kitt Peak || Spacewatch || NYS || align=right data-sort-value="0.53" | 530 m || 
|-id=648 bgcolor=#fefefe
| 386648 ||  || — || June 2, 2005 || Siding Spring || SSS || — || align=right data-sort-value="0.90" | 900 m || 
|-id=649 bgcolor=#C2FFFF
| 386649 ||  || — || September 20, 2009 || Kitt Peak || Spacewatch || L4 || align=right | 9.0 km || 
|-id=650 bgcolor=#fefefe
| 386650 ||  || — || September 21, 2009 || Kitt Peak || Spacewatch || V || align=right data-sort-value="0.62" | 620 m || 
|-id=651 bgcolor=#fefefe
| 386651 ||  || — || September 21, 2009 || Mount Lemmon || Mount Lemmon Survey || NYS || align=right data-sort-value="0.57" | 570 m || 
|-id=652 bgcolor=#fefefe
| 386652 ||  || — || September 20, 2009 || Mount Lemmon || Mount Lemmon Survey || — || align=right data-sort-value="0.81" | 810 m || 
|-id=653 bgcolor=#fefefe
| 386653 ||  || — || September 28, 2009 || Mount Lemmon || Mount Lemmon Survey || — || align=right data-sort-value="0.87" | 870 m || 
|-id=654 bgcolor=#fefefe
| 386654 ||  || — || October 10, 2009 || La Sagra || OAM Obs. || PHO || align=right | 1.2 km || 
|-id=655 bgcolor=#FA8072
| 386655 ||  || — || October 12, 2009 || La Sagra || OAM Obs. || — || align=right | 1.1 km || 
|-id=656 bgcolor=#fefefe
| 386656 ||  || — || October 11, 2009 || Mount Lemmon || Mount Lemmon Survey || NYS || align=right data-sort-value="0.55" | 550 m || 
|-id=657 bgcolor=#fefefe
| 386657 ||  || — || October 14, 2009 || Catalina || CSS || — || align=right data-sort-value="0.96" | 960 m || 
|-id=658 bgcolor=#fefefe
| 386658 ||  || — || October 17, 2009 || La Sagra || OAM Obs. || — || align=right | 1.2 km || 
|-id=659 bgcolor=#fefefe
| 386659 ||  || — || October 18, 2009 || Mount Lemmon || Mount Lemmon Survey || V || align=right data-sort-value="0.75" | 750 m || 
|-id=660 bgcolor=#fefefe
| 386660 ||  || — || October 18, 2009 || Mount Lemmon || Mount Lemmon Survey || NYS || align=right data-sort-value="0.77" | 770 m || 
|-id=661 bgcolor=#fefefe
| 386661 ||  || — || October 18, 2009 || Mount Lemmon || Mount Lemmon Survey || MAS || align=right data-sort-value="0.63" | 630 m || 
|-id=662 bgcolor=#fefefe
| 386662 ||  || — || October 22, 2009 || Mount Lemmon || Mount Lemmon Survey || FLO || align=right data-sort-value="0.63" | 630 m || 
|-id=663 bgcolor=#fefefe
| 386663 ||  || — || October 23, 2009 || Mount Lemmon || Mount Lemmon Survey || — || align=right data-sort-value="0.82" | 820 m || 
|-id=664 bgcolor=#fefefe
| 386664 ||  || — || October 21, 2009 || Mount Lemmon || Mount Lemmon Survey || — || align=right | 1.5 km || 
|-id=665 bgcolor=#fefefe
| 386665 ||  || — || October 21, 2009 || Mount Lemmon || Mount Lemmon Survey || EUT || align=right data-sort-value="0.54" | 540 m || 
|-id=666 bgcolor=#fefefe
| 386666 ||  || — || September 18, 2009 || Mount Lemmon || Mount Lemmon Survey || — || align=right data-sort-value="0.72" | 720 m || 
|-id=667 bgcolor=#fefefe
| 386667 ||  || — || October 23, 2009 || Mount Lemmon || Mount Lemmon Survey || NYS || align=right data-sort-value="0.66" | 660 m || 
|-id=668 bgcolor=#fefefe
| 386668 ||  || — || October 23, 2009 || Mount Lemmon || Mount Lemmon Survey || NYS || align=right data-sort-value="0.54" | 540 m || 
|-id=669 bgcolor=#fefefe
| 386669 ||  || — || January 10, 2007 || Mount Lemmon || Mount Lemmon Survey || NYS || align=right data-sort-value="0.54" | 540 m || 
|-id=670 bgcolor=#fefefe
| 386670 ||  || — || October 24, 2009 || Kitt Peak || Spacewatch || NYS || align=right data-sort-value="0.73" | 730 m || 
|-id=671 bgcolor=#fefefe
| 386671 ||  || — || October 29, 2009 || Bisei SG Center || BATTeRS || — || align=right data-sort-value="0.69" | 690 m || 
|-id=672 bgcolor=#fefefe
| 386672 ||  || — || October 29, 2009 || Bisei SG Center || BATTeRS || — || align=right data-sort-value="0.76" | 760 m || 
|-id=673 bgcolor=#fefefe
| 386673 ||  || — || October 27, 2009 || Mount Lemmon || Mount Lemmon Survey || — || align=right | 1.0 km || 
|-id=674 bgcolor=#C2FFFF
| 386674 ||  || — || October 16, 2009 || Mount Lemmon || Mount Lemmon Survey || L4 || align=right | 9.4 km || 
|-id=675 bgcolor=#fefefe
| 386675 ||  || — || November 9, 2009 || Catalina || CSS || ERI || align=right | 2.3 km || 
|-id=676 bgcolor=#fefefe
| 386676 ||  || — || November 10, 2009 || La Sagra || OAM Obs. || NYS || align=right data-sort-value="0.67" | 670 m || 
|-id=677 bgcolor=#fefefe
| 386677 ||  || — || November 11, 2009 || La Sagra || OAM Obs. || FLO || align=right data-sort-value="0.90" | 900 m || 
|-id=678 bgcolor=#fefefe
| 386678 ||  || — || November 15, 2009 || Catalina || CSS || — || align=right data-sort-value="0.70" | 700 m || 
|-id=679 bgcolor=#fefefe
| 386679 ||  || — || November 11, 2009 || Socorro || LINEAR || NYS || align=right data-sort-value="0.71" | 710 m || 
|-id=680 bgcolor=#fefefe
| 386680 ||  || — || November 12, 2009 || La Sagra || OAM Obs. || NYS || align=right data-sort-value="0.60" | 600 m || 
|-id=681 bgcolor=#fefefe
| 386681 ||  || — || November 8, 2009 || Kitt Peak || Spacewatch || MAS || align=right data-sort-value="0.63" | 630 m || 
|-id=682 bgcolor=#fefefe
| 386682 ||  || — || November 9, 2009 || Kitt Peak || Spacewatch || NYS || align=right data-sort-value="0.65" | 650 m || 
|-id=683 bgcolor=#fefefe
| 386683 ||  || — || November 9, 2009 || Kitt Peak || Spacewatch || — || align=right data-sort-value="0.75" | 750 m || 
|-id=684 bgcolor=#fefefe
| 386684 ||  || — || November 9, 2009 || Kitt Peak || Spacewatch || NYS || align=right data-sort-value="0.60" | 600 m || 
|-id=685 bgcolor=#fefefe
| 386685 ||  || — || November 12, 2009 || La Sagra || OAM Obs. || — || align=right data-sort-value="0.84" | 840 m || 
|-id=686 bgcolor=#fefefe
| 386686 ||  || — || November 10, 2009 || La Sagra || OAM Obs. || NYS || align=right data-sort-value="0.67" | 670 m || 
|-id=687 bgcolor=#FA8072
| 386687 ||  || — || August 17, 2009 || Catalina || CSS || — || align=right data-sort-value="0.89" | 890 m || 
|-id=688 bgcolor=#fefefe
| 386688 ||  || — || November 15, 2009 || Catalina || CSS || V || align=right data-sort-value="0.67" | 670 m || 
|-id=689 bgcolor=#fefefe
| 386689 ||  || — || November 18, 2009 || Marly || P. Kocher || FLO || align=right | 1.8 km || 
|-id=690 bgcolor=#fefefe
| 386690 ||  || — || November 19, 2009 || Socorro || LINEAR || — || align=right data-sort-value="0.72" | 720 m || 
|-id=691 bgcolor=#fefefe
| 386691 ||  || — || November 19, 2009 || Socorro || LINEAR || — || align=right data-sort-value="0.85" | 850 m || 
|-id=692 bgcolor=#fefefe
| 386692 ||  || — || February 6, 2007 || Mount Lemmon || Mount Lemmon Survey || — || align=right data-sort-value="0.56" | 560 m || 
|-id=693 bgcolor=#d6d6d6
| 386693 ||  || — || September 20, 2009 || Mount Lemmon || Mount Lemmon Survey || CHA || align=right | 2.4 km || 
|-id=694 bgcolor=#E9E9E9
| 386694 ||  || — || November 16, 2009 || Mount Lemmon || Mount Lemmon Survey || MAR || align=right | 1.3 km || 
|-id=695 bgcolor=#fefefe
| 386695 ||  || — || November 17, 2009 || Kitt Peak || Spacewatch || NYS || align=right data-sort-value="0.46" | 460 m || 
|-id=696 bgcolor=#fefefe
| 386696 ||  || — || November 17, 2009 || Kitt Peak || Spacewatch || — || align=right | 2.0 km || 
|-id=697 bgcolor=#fefefe
| 386697 ||  || — || November 17, 2009 || Kitt Peak || Spacewatch || — || align=right data-sort-value="0.78" | 780 m || 
|-id=698 bgcolor=#fefefe
| 386698 ||  || — || November 17, 2009 || Kitt Peak || Spacewatch || MAS || align=right data-sort-value="0.59" | 590 m || 
|-id=699 bgcolor=#fefefe
| 386699 ||  || — || November 17, 2009 || Kitt Peak || Spacewatch || MAS || align=right data-sort-value="0.71" | 710 m || 
|-id=700 bgcolor=#fefefe
| 386700 ||  || — || November 18, 2009 || Kitt Peak || Spacewatch || FLO || align=right data-sort-value="0.57" | 570 m || 
|}

386701–386800 

|-bgcolor=#fefefe
| 386701 ||  || — || November 18, 2009 || Kitt Peak || Spacewatch || MAS || align=right data-sort-value="0.78" | 780 m || 
|-id=702 bgcolor=#fefefe
| 386702 ||  || — || November 18, 2009 || Kitt Peak || Spacewatch || V || align=right data-sort-value="0.76" | 760 m || 
|-id=703 bgcolor=#fefefe
| 386703 ||  || — || November 19, 2009 || Kitt Peak || Spacewatch || — || align=right | 1.1 km || 
|-id=704 bgcolor=#fefefe
| 386704 ||  || — || June 17, 2005 || Mount Lemmon || Mount Lemmon Survey || NYS || align=right data-sort-value="0.80" | 800 m || 
|-id=705 bgcolor=#fefefe
| 386705 ||  || — || November 22, 2009 || Kitt Peak || Spacewatch || FLO || align=right data-sort-value="0.57" | 570 m || 
|-id=706 bgcolor=#fefefe
| 386706 ||  || — || November 20, 2009 || Kitt Peak || Spacewatch || MAS || align=right data-sort-value="0.60" | 600 m || 
|-id=707 bgcolor=#E9E9E9
| 386707 ||  || — || November 20, 2009 || Kitt Peak || Spacewatch || MAR || align=right | 1.0 km || 
|-id=708 bgcolor=#fefefe
| 386708 ||  || — || October 30, 2002 || Kitt Peak || Spacewatch || — || align=right data-sort-value="0.76" | 760 m || 
|-id=709 bgcolor=#fefefe
| 386709 ||  || — || November 21, 2009 || Kitt Peak || Spacewatch || NYS || align=right data-sort-value="0.59" | 590 m || 
|-id=710 bgcolor=#fefefe
| 386710 ||  || — || November 22, 2009 || Kitt Peak || Spacewatch || — || align=right | 2.1 km || 
|-id=711 bgcolor=#E9E9E9
| 386711 ||  || — || November 9, 2005 || Kitt Peak || Spacewatch || — || align=right | 1.1 km || 
|-id=712 bgcolor=#fefefe
| 386712 ||  || — || November 17, 2009 || Mount Lemmon || Mount Lemmon Survey || — || align=right data-sort-value="0.86" | 860 m || 
|-id=713 bgcolor=#E9E9E9
| 386713 ||  || — || November 12, 2005 || Kitt Peak || Spacewatch || — || align=right data-sort-value="0.76" | 760 m || 
|-id=714 bgcolor=#fefefe
| 386714 ||  || — || November 24, 2009 || Mount Lemmon || Mount Lemmon Survey || NYS || align=right data-sort-value="0.66" | 660 m || 
|-id=715 bgcolor=#fefefe
| 386715 ||  || — || February 27, 2007 || Kitt Peak || Spacewatch || — || align=right data-sort-value="0.86" | 860 m || 
|-id=716 bgcolor=#fefefe
| 386716 ||  || — || November 19, 2009 || Catalina || CSS || FLO || align=right data-sort-value="0.77" | 770 m || 
|-id=717 bgcolor=#fefefe
| 386717 ||  || — || November 17, 2009 || Kitt Peak || Spacewatch || — || align=right | 1.0 km || 
|-id=718 bgcolor=#fefefe
| 386718 ||  || — || November 17, 2009 || Kitt Peak || Spacewatch || NYS || align=right | 1.3 km || 
|-id=719 bgcolor=#E9E9E9
| 386719 ||  || — || November 21, 2009 || Mount Lemmon || Mount Lemmon Survey || — || align=right | 1.1 km || 
|-id=720 bgcolor=#FFC2E0
| 386720 ||  || — || December 11, 2009 || Socorro || LINEAR || AMO +1km || align=right data-sort-value="0.96" | 960 m || 
|-id=721 bgcolor=#fefefe
| 386721 ||  || — || August 31, 2005 || Kitt Peak || Spacewatch || NYS || align=right | 1.7 km || 
|-id=722 bgcolor=#E9E9E9
| 386722 ||  || — || December 17, 2009 || Mount Lemmon || Mount Lemmon Survey || — || align=right data-sort-value="0.92" | 920 m || 
|-id=723 bgcolor=#C2E0FF
| 386723 ||  || — || December 17, 2009 || La Silla || D. L. Rabinowitz || Haumea || align=right | 518 km || 
|-id=724 bgcolor=#fefefe
| 386724 ||  || — || December 27, 2009 || Kitt Peak || Spacewatch || SUL || align=right | 2.0 km || 
|-id=725 bgcolor=#E9E9E9
| 386725 ||  || — || December 16, 2009 || Socorro || LINEAR || — || align=right | 2.2 km || 
|-id=726 bgcolor=#fefefe
| 386726 ||  || — || January 5, 2010 || Kitt Peak || Spacewatch || — || align=right data-sort-value="0.83" | 830 m || 
|-id=727 bgcolor=#E9E9E9
| 386727 ||  || — || January 5, 2010 || Kitt Peak || Spacewatch || EUN || align=right | 1.3 km || 
|-id=728 bgcolor=#fefefe
| 386728 ||  || — || January 6, 2010 || Kitt Peak || Spacewatch || — || align=right | 1.1 km || 
|-id=729 bgcolor=#E9E9E9
| 386729 ||  || — || January 7, 2010 || Kitt Peak || Spacewatch || — || align=right | 2.4 km || 
|-id=730 bgcolor=#E9E9E9
| 386730 ||  || — || January 8, 2010 || Kitt Peak || Spacewatch || BAR || align=right data-sort-value="0.93" | 930 m || 
|-id=731 bgcolor=#fefefe
| 386731 ||  || — || January 7, 2010 || Kitt Peak || Spacewatch || — || align=right | 1.2 km || 
|-id=732 bgcolor=#fefefe
| 386732 ||  || — || January 6, 2010 || Catalina || CSS || V || align=right data-sort-value="0.82" | 820 m || 
|-id=733 bgcolor=#E9E9E9
| 386733 ||  || — || November 19, 2009 || Mount Lemmon || Mount Lemmon Survey || RAF || align=right data-sort-value="0.88" | 880 m || 
|-id=734 bgcolor=#fefefe
| 386734 ||  || — || November 28, 2005 || Kitt Peak || Spacewatch || — || align=right | 1.1 km || 
|-id=735 bgcolor=#fefefe
| 386735 ||  || — || December 18, 2009 || Mount Lemmon || Mount Lemmon Survey || NYS || align=right data-sort-value="0.96" | 960 m || 
|-id=736 bgcolor=#fefefe
| 386736 ||  || — || January 7, 2010 || Mount Lemmon || Mount Lemmon Survey || — || align=right data-sort-value="0.89" | 890 m || 
|-id=737 bgcolor=#fefefe
| 386737 ||  || — || September 22, 2008 || Kitt Peak || Spacewatch || V || align=right | 1.0 km || 
|-id=738 bgcolor=#d6d6d6
| 386738 ||  || — || September 12, 2007 || Mount Lemmon || Mount Lemmon Survey || — || align=right | 4.7 km || 
|-id=739 bgcolor=#E9E9E9
| 386739 ||  || — || January 11, 2010 || Kitt Peak || Spacewatch || — || align=right | 1.7 km || 
|-id=740 bgcolor=#d6d6d6
| 386740 ||  || — || January 11, 2010 || Kitt Peak || Spacewatch || ITH || align=right | 1.2 km || 
|-id=741 bgcolor=#fefefe
| 386741 ||  || — || July 29, 2008 || Mount Lemmon || Mount Lemmon Survey || V || align=right data-sort-value="0.74" | 740 m || 
|-id=742 bgcolor=#E9E9E9
| 386742 ||  || — || January 12, 2010 || Kitt Peak || Spacewatch || — || align=right | 2.7 km || 
|-id=743 bgcolor=#d6d6d6
| 386743 ||  || — || January 13, 2010 || WISE || WISE || — || align=right | 4.8 km || 
|-id=744 bgcolor=#E9E9E9
| 386744 ||  || — || January 19, 2010 || Dauban || F. Kugel || EUN || align=right | 1.2 km || 
|-id=745 bgcolor=#d6d6d6
| 386745 ||  || — || December 5, 2008 || Mount Lemmon || Mount Lemmon Survey || ALA || align=right | 3.6 km || 
|-id=746 bgcolor=#E9E9E9
| 386746 ||  || — || January 16, 2010 || WISE || WISE || GEF || align=right | 2.4 km || 
|-id=747 bgcolor=#d6d6d6
| 386747 ||  || — || January 17, 2010 || WISE || WISE || EUP || align=right | 4.7 km || 
|-id=748 bgcolor=#d6d6d6
| 386748 ||  || — || October 13, 2007 || Mount Lemmon || Mount Lemmon Survey || — || align=right | 3.1 km || 
|-id=749 bgcolor=#E9E9E9
| 386749 ||  || — || January 21, 2010 || WISE || WISE || — || align=right | 2.1 km || 
|-id=750 bgcolor=#d6d6d6
| 386750 ||  || — || January 27, 2010 || WISE || WISE || SHU3:2 || align=right | 5.5 km || 
|-id=751 bgcolor=#d6d6d6
| 386751 ||  || — || February 9, 2010 || WISE || WISE || VER || align=right | 4.5 km || 
|-id=752 bgcolor=#E9E9E9
| 386752 ||  || — || February 9, 2010 || WISE || WISE || — || align=right | 2.4 km || 
|-id=753 bgcolor=#E9E9E9
| 386753 ||  || — || October 7, 2008 || Mount Lemmon || Mount Lemmon Survey || — || align=right | 1.8 km || 
|-id=754 bgcolor=#E9E9E9
| 386754 ||  || — || February 13, 2010 || Mount Lemmon || Mount Lemmon Survey || KRM || align=right | 2.2 km || 
|-id=755 bgcolor=#E9E9E9
| 386755 ||  || — || February 13, 2010 || Mount Lemmon || Mount Lemmon Survey || ADE || align=right | 2.5 km || 
|-id=756 bgcolor=#fefefe
| 386756 ||  || — || February 14, 2010 || Socorro || LINEAR || — || align=right | 1.3 km || 
|-id=757 bgcolor=#E9E9E9
| 386757 ||  || — || February 9, 2010 || Kitt Peak || Spacewatch || MAR || align=right | 1.2 km || 
|-id=758 bgcolor=#E9E9E9
| 386758 ||  || — || February 10, 2010 || Kitt Peak || Spacewatch || — || align=right data-sort-value="0.98" | 980 m || 
|-id=759 bgcolor=#fefefe
| 386759 ||  || — || February 14, 2010 || Mount Lemmon || Mount Lemmon Survey || — || align=right | 1.1 km || 
|-id=760 bgcolor=#E9E9E9
| 386760 ||  || — || February 14, 2010 || Kitt Peak || Spacewatch || — || align=right | 1.1 km || 
|-id=761 bgcolor=#E9E9E9
| 386761 ||  || — || February 14, 2010 || Kitt Peak || Spacewatch || — || align=right | 1.1 km || 
|-id=762 bgcolor=#E9E9E9
| 386762 ||  || — || February 14, 2010 || Mount Lemmon || Mount Lemmon Survey || — || align=right data-sort-value="0.75" | 750 m || 
|-id=763 bgcolor=#fefefe
| 386763 ||  || — || October 10, 2004 || Kitt Peak || Spacewatch || MAS || align=right data-sort-value="0.97" | 970 m || 
|-id=764 bgcolor=#E9E9E9
| 386764 ||  || — || June 17, 2007 || Kitt Peak || Spacewatch || — || align=right | 2.2 km || 
|-id=765 bgcolor=#E9E9E9
| 386765 ||  || — || February 9, 2010 || Catalina || CSS || — || align=right | 2.2 km || 
|-id=766 bgcolor=#E9E9E9
| 386766 ||  || — || February 13, 2010 || Mount Lemmon || Mount Lemmon Survey || — || align=right | 1.6 km || 
|-id=767 bgcolor=#E9E9E9
| 386767 ||  || — || November 27, 2009 || Mount Lemmon || Mount Lemmon Survey || — || align=right | 2.7 km || 
|-id=768 bgcolor=#E9E9E9
| 386768 ||  || — || February 9, 2010 || Kitt Peak || Spacewatch || KON || align=right | 1.9 km || 
|-id=769 bgcolor=#E9E9E9
| 386769 ||  || — || February 15, 2010 || Catalina || CSS || — || align=right | 2.4 km || 
|-id=770 bgcolor=#E9E9E9
| 386770 ||  || — || February 9, 2010 || Kitt Peak || Spacewatch || MIS || align=right | 2.0 km || 
|-id=771 bgcolor=#E9E9E9
| 386771 ||  || — || February 14, 2010 || Catalina || CSS || — || align=right | 2.2 km || 
|-id=772 bgcolor=#d6d6d6
| 386772 ||  || — || February 8, 2010 || WISE || WISE || — || align=right | 3.5 km || 
|-id=773 bgcolor=#d6d6d6
| 386773 ||  || — || February 8, 2010 || WISE || WISE || — || align=right | 2.6 km || 
|-id=774 bgcolor=#d6d6d6
| 386774 ||  || — || February 8, 2010 || WISE || WISE || URS || align=right | 4.7 km || 
|-id=775 bgcolor=#d6d6d6
| 386775 ||  || — || January 31, 2009 || Kitt Peak || Spacewatch || — || align=right | 2.9 km || 
|-id=776 bgcolor=#E9E9E9
| 386776 ||  || — || February 16, 2010 || Kitt Peak || Spacewatch || — || align=right data-sort-value="0.88" | 880 m || 
|-id=777 bgcolor=#E9E9E9
| 386777 ||  || — || February 16, 2010 || Mount Lemmon || Mount Lemmon Survey || — || align=right | 2.6 km || 
|-id=778 bgcolor=#d6d6d6
| 386778 ||  || — || February 19, 2010 || WISE || WISE || TRE || align=right | 3.7 km || 
|-id=779 bgcolor=#E9E9E9
| 386779 ||  || — || February 17, 2010 || Kitt Peak || Spacewatch || JUN || align=right | 1.1 km || 
|-id=780 bgcolor=#E9E9E9
| 386780 ||  || — || October 19, 2008 || Kitt Peak || Spacewatch || — || align=right | 1.2 km || 
|-id=781 bgcolor=#E9E9E9
| 386781 ||  || — || September 29, 2008 || Mount Lemmon || Mount Lemmon Survey || — || align=right | 1.5 km || 
|-id=782 bgcolor=#E9E9E9
| 386782 ||  || — || February 18, 2010 || Catalina || CSS || ADE || align=right | 2.0 km || 
|-id=783 bgcolor=#E9E9E9
| 386783 ||  || — || February 18, 2010 || Kitt Peak || Spacewatch || HNS || align=right | 1.3 km || 
|-id=784 bgcolor=#d6d6d6
| 386784 ||  || — || March 8, 2010 || WISE || WISE || — || align=right | 4.5 km || 
|-id=785 bgcolor=#E9E9E9
| 386785 ||  || — || March 4, 2010 || Kitt Peak || Spacewatch || — || align=right | 1.8 km || 
|-id=786 bgcolor=#E9E9E9
| 386786 ||  || — || March 4, 2010 || Kitt Peak || Spacewatch || — || align=right | 1.9 km || 
|-id=787 bgcolor=#E9E9E9
| 386787 ||  || — || March 10, 2010 || La Sagra || OAM Obs. || ADE || align=right | 2.6 km || 
|-id=788 bgcolor=#E9E9E9
| 386788 ||  || — || March 12, 2010 || Mount Lemmon || Mount Lemmon Survey || — || align=right | 1.4 km || 
|-id=789 bgcolor=#E9E9E9
| 386789 ||  || — || March 5, 2010 || Catalina || CSS || — || align=right | 2.4 km || 
|-id=790 bgcolor=#E9E9E9
| 386790 ||  || — || March 13, 2010 || Črni Vrh || Črni Vrh || — || align=right | 2.4 km || 
|-id=791 bgcolor=#E9E9E9
| 386791 ||  || — || March 14, 2010 || Catalina || CSS || — || align=right | 1.3 km || 
|-id=792 bgcolor=#E9E9E9
| 386792 ||  || — || March 23, 2006 || Kitt Peak || Spacewatch || — || align=right | 1.2 km || 
|-id=793 bgcolor=#E9E9E9
| 386793 ||  || — || June 14, 2007 || Kitt Peak || Spacewatch || EUN || align=right | 1.6 km || 
|-id=794 bgcolor=#E9E9E9
| 386794 ||  || — || March 13, 2010 || Catalina || CSS || — || align=right | 2.3 km || 
|-id=795 bgcolor=#E9E9E9
| 386795 ||  || — || February 9, 1997 || Kitt Peak || Spacewatch || — || align=right | 1.6 km || 
|-id=796 bgcolor=#E9E9E9
| 386796 ||  || — || September 28, 2003 || Kitt Peak || Spacewatch || — || align=right | 1.4 km || 
|-id=797 bgcolor=#E9E9E9
| 386797 ||  || — || March 13, 2010 || Kitt Peak || Spacewatch || MRX || align=right | 1.1 km || 
|-id=798 bgcolor=#E9E9E9
| 386798 ||  || — || March 14, 2010 || La Sagra || OAM Obs. || — || align=right | 2.3 km || 
|-id=799 bgcolor=#E9E9E9
| 386799 ||  || — || March 15, 2010 || Kitt Peak || Spacewatch || — || align=right | 1.1 km || 
|-id=800 bgcolor=#E9E9E9
| 386800 ||  || — || March 13, 2005 || Kitt Peak || Spacewatch || MRX || align=right | 1.2 km || 
|}

386801–386900 

|-bgcolor=#E9E9E9
| 386801 ||  || — || October 2, 2003 || Kitt Peak || Spacewatch || MRX || align=right | 1.1 km || 
|-id=802 bgcolor=#E9E9E9
| 386802 ||  || — || March 14, 2010 || Catalina || CSS || — || align=right | 1.4 km || 
|-id=803 bgcolor=#E9E9E9
| 386803 ||  || — || March 13, 2010 || Kitt Peak || Spacewatch || — || align=right | 1.7 km || 
|-id=804 bgcolor=#d6d6d6
| 386804 ||  || — || November 13, 2007 || Mount Lemmon || Mount Lemmon Survey || EMA || align=right | 3.8 km || 
|-id=805 bgcolor=#E9E9E9
| 386805 ||  || — || February 18, 2010 || Kitt Peak || Spacewatch || — || align=right | 1.5 km || 
|-id=806 bgcolor=#E9E9E9
| 386806 ||  || — || March 16, 2010 || Mount Lemmon || Mount Lemmon Survey || EUN || align=right | 1.2 km || 
|-id=807 bgcolor=#E9E9E9
| 386807 ||  || — || September 13, 2007 || Mount Lemmon || Mount Lemmon Survey || — || align=right | 2.1 km || 
|-id=808 bgcolor=#E9E9E9
| 386808 ||  || — || December 18, 2004 || Mount Lemmon || Mount Lemmon Survey || HEN || align=right | 1.1 km || 
|-id=809 bgcolor=#E9E9E9
| 386809 ||  || — || June 22, 2007 || Kitt Peak || Spacewatch || — || align=right | 1.6 km || 
|-id=810 bgcolor=#E9E9E9
| 386810 ||  || — || March 18, 2010 || Kitt Peak || Spacewatch || HOF || align=right | 2.5 km || 
|-id=811 bgcolor=#E9E9E9
| 386811 ||  || — || March 20, 2010 || Kitt Peak || Spacewatch || — || align=right | 1.5 km || 
|-id=812 bgcolor=#E9E9E9
| 386812 ||  || — || March 19, 2010 || Kitt Peak || Spacewatch || — || align=right | 1.7 km || 
|-id=813 bgcolor=#E9E9E9
| 386813 ||  || — || March 18, 2010 || Kitt Peak || Spacewatch || MIS || align=right | 2.1 km || 
|-id=814 bgcolor=#E9E9E9
| 386814 ||  || — || March 18, 2010 || Kitt Peak || Spacewatch || PAD || align=right | 1.7 km || 
|-id=815 bgcolor=#E9E9E9
| 386815 ||  || — || February 9, 2005 || Kitt Peak || Spacewatch || — || align=right | 2.0 km || 
|-id=816 bgcolor=#E9E9E9
| 386816 ||  || — || April 5, 2010 || Sandlot || G. Hug || DOR || align=right | 2.8 km || 
|-id=817 bgcolor=#d6d6d6
| 386817 ||  || — || October 11, 2007 || Mount Lemmon || Mount Lemmon Survey || — || align=right | 3.2 km || 
|-id=818 bgcolor=#d6d6d6
| 386818 ||  || — || April 5, 2010 || Kitt Peak || Spacewatch || — || align=right | 2.3 km || 
|-id=819 bgcolor=#E9E9E9
| 386819 ||  || — || April 8, 2010 || Purple Mountain || PMO NEO || — || align=right | 2.2 km || 
|-id=820 bgcolor=#E9E9E9
| 386820 ||  || — || April 10, 2010 || Plana || F. Fratev || — || align=right data-sort-value="0.87" | 870 m || 
|-id=821 bgcolor=#E9E9E9
| 386821 ||  || — || April 6, 2010 || Catalina || CSS || — || align=right | 1.9 km || 
|-id=822 bgcolor=#E9E9E9
| 386822 ||  || — || April 4, 2010 || Catalina || CSS || — || align=right | 1.8 km || 
|-id=823 bgcolor=#E9E9E9
| 386823 ||  || — || March 12, 2010 || Kitt Peak || Spacewatch || — || align=right | 1.5 km || 
|-id=824 bgcolor=#E9E9E9
| 386824 ||  || — || October 24, 2003 || Kitt Peak || Spacewatch || NEM || align=right | 2.8 km || 
|-id=825 bgcolor=#d6d6d6
| 386825 ||  || — || May 8, 2005 || Mount Lemmon || Mount Lemmon Survey || — || align=right | 2.4 km || 
|-id=826 bgcolor=#E9E9E9
| 386826 ||  || — || April 10, 2010 || Kitt Peak || Spacewatch || — || align=right | 1.4 km || 
|-id=827 bgcolor=#E9E9E9
| 386827 ||  || — || April 8, 2010 || Kitt Peak || Spacewatch || — || align=right | 2.0 km || 
|-id=828 bgcolor=#d6d6d6
| 386828 ||  || — || April 10, 2010 || Mount Lemmon || Mount Lemmon Survey || EOS || align=right | 2.0 km || 
|-id=829 bgcolor=#E9E9E9
| 386829 ||  || — || April 9, 2010 || Catalina || CSS || — || align=right | 3.2 km || 
|-id=830 bgcolor=#E9E9E9
| 386830 ||  || — || February 16, 2001 || Kitt Peak || Spacewatch || — || align=right | 2.4 km || 
|-id=831 bgcolor=#d6d6d6
| 386831 ||  || — || March 15, 2009 || Kitt Peak || Spacewatch || — || align=right | 3.8 km || 
|-id=832 bgcolor=#C2FFFF
| 386832 ||  || — || April 25, 2010 || WISE || WISE || L5 || align=right | 8.6 km || 
|-id=833 bgcolor=#d6d6d6
| 386833 ||  || — || April 20, 2010 || Mount Lemmon || Mount Lemmon Survey || EOS || align=right | 3.3 km || 
|-id=834 bgcolor=#d6d6d6
| 386834 ||  || — || April 9, 2010 || Kitt Peak || Spacewatch || — || align=right | 3.1 km || 
|-id=835 bgcolor=#E9E9E9
| 386835 ||  || — || May 6, 2010 || Catalina || CSS || JUN || align=right | 1.6 km || 
|-id=836 bgcolor=#d6d6d6
| 386836 ||  || — || February 23, 2010 || WISE || WISE || ARM || align=right | 4.6 km || 
|-id=837 bgcolor=#d6d6d6
| 386837 ||  || — || January 25, 2009 || Kitt Peak || Spacewatch || — || align=right | 2.8 km || 
|-id=838 bgcolor=#E9E9E9
| 386838 ||  || — || February 9, 2005 || Kitt Peak || Spacewatch || AEO || align=right | 1.4 km || 
|-id=839 bgcolor=#d6d6d6
| 386839 ||  || — || January 31, 2009 || Mount Lemmon || Mount Lemmon Survey || — || align=right | 3.3 km || 
|-id=840 bgcolor=#d6d6d6
| 386840 ||  || — || May 12, 2010 || WISE || WISE || THB || align=right | 4.2 km || 
|-id=841 bgcolor=#E9E9E9
| 386841 ||  || — || February 14, 2010 || Mount Lemmon || Mount Lemmon Survey || JUN || align=right | 1.1 km || 
|-id=842 bgcolor=#d6d6d6
| 386842 ||  || — || February 18, 2010 || WISE || WISE || HYG || align=right | 3.9 km || 
|-id=843 bgcolor=#d6d6d6
| 386843 ||  || — || May 12, 2010 || Kitt Peak || Spacewatch || — || align=right | 3.1 km || 
|-id=844 bgcolor=#d6d6d6
| 386844 ||  || — || February 29, 2000 || Socorro || LINEAR || BRA || align=right | 1.9 km || 
|-id=845 bgcolor=#E9E9E9
| 386845 ||  || — || December 10, 2004 || Kitt Peak || Spacewatch || — || align=right | 2.2 km || 
|-id=846 bgcolor=#d6d6d6
| 386846 ||  || — || May 17, 2010 || WISE || WISE || EUP || align=right | 4.4 km || 
|-id=847 bgcolor=#FFC2E0
| 386847 ||  || — || June 6, 2010 || WISE || WISE || APO +1kmPHA || align=right data-sort-value="0.66" | 660 m || 
|-id=848 bgcolor=#d6d6d6
| 386848 ||  || — || September 14, 2006 || Kitt Peak || Spacewatch || THM || align=right | 2.4 km || 
|-id=849 bgcolor=#E9E9E9
| 386849 ||  || — || March 13, 2010 || Catalina || CSS || ADE || align=right | 1.7 km || 
|-id=850 bgcolor=#d6d6d6
| 386850 ||  || — || December 29, 2008 || Mount Lemmon || Mount Lemmon Survey || — || align=right | 3.7 km || 
|-id=851 bgcolor=#E9E9E9
| 386851 Streep ||  ||  || June 26, 2010 || WISE || WISE || — || align=right | 2.8 km || 
|-id=852 bgcolor=#fefefe
| 386852 ||  || — || August 14, 2010 || Socorro || LINEAR || H || align=right data-sort-value="0.89" | 890 m || 
|-id=853 bgcolor=#C2FFFF
| 386853 ||  || — || September 7, 2008 || Mount Lemmon || Mount Lemmon Survey || L4 || align=right | 7.9 km || 
|-id=854 bgcolor=#C2FFFF
| 386854 ||  || — || September 5, 2008 || Kitt Peak || Spacewatch || L4 || align=right | 8.7 km || 
|-id=855 bgcolor=#fefefe
| 386855 ||  || — || March 25, 2006 || Kitt Peak || Spacewatch || — || align=right data-sort-value="0.78" | 780 m || 
|-id=856 bgcolor=#C2FFFF
| 386856 ||  || — || November 12, 2010 || Mount Lemmon || Mount Lemmon Survey || L4 || align=right | 9.7 km || 
|-id=857 bgcolor=#fefefe
| 386857 ||  || — || January 22, 2006 || Catalina || CSS || H || align=right data-sort-value="0.60" | 600 m || 
|-id=858 bgcolor=#d6d6d6
| 386858 ||  || — || August 18, 2009 || Kitt Peak || Spacewatch || — || align=right | 3.1 km || 
|-id=859 bgcolor=#fefefe
| 386859 ||  || — || December 5, 2007 || Catalina || CSS || — || align=right | 1.00 km || 
|-id=860 bgcolor=#fefefe
| 386860 ||  || — || August 23, 2001 || Anderson Mesa || LONEOS || H || align=right data-sort-value="0.48" | 480 m || 
|-id=861 bgcolor=#fefefe
| 386861 ||  || — || December 10, 2010 || Mount Lemmon || Mount Lemmon Survey || — || align=right data-sort-value="0.88" | 880 m || 
|-id=862 bgcolor=#fefefe
| 386862 ||  || — || December 15, 2006 || Kitt Peak || Spacewatch || — || align=right | 1.0 km || 
|-id=863 bgcolor=#fefefe
| 386863 ||  || — || August 20, 2009 || Kitt Peak || Spacewatch || V || align=right data-sort-value="0.66" | 660 m || 
|-id=864 bgcolor=#fefefe
| 386864 ||  || — || August 28, 2009 || Kitt Peak || Spacewatch || — || align=right data-sort-value="0.65" | 650 m || 
|-id=865 bgcolor=#fefefe
| 386865 ||  || — || February 23, 2011 || Catalina || CSS || — || align=right | 1.4 km || 
|-id=866 bgcolor=#fefefe
| 386866 ||  || — || August 30, 2005 || Kitt Peak || Spacewatch || — || align=right data-sort-value="0.65" | 650 m || 
|-id=867 bgcolor=#fefefe
| 386867 ||  || — || February 10, 2011 || Mount Lemmon || Mount Lemmon Survey || FLO || align=right data-sort-value="0.49" | 490 m || 
|-id=868 bgcolor=#fefefe
| 386868 ||  || — || October 19, 2006 || Kitt Peak || Spacewatch || FLO || align=right data-sort-value="0.66" | 660 m || 
|-id=869 bgcolor=#fefefe
| 386869 ||  || — || April 4, 2008 || Kitt Peak || Spacewatch || — || align=right data-sort-value="0.68" | 680 m || 
|-id=870 bgcolor=#fefefe
| 386870 ||  || — || January 24, 2007 || Mount Lemmon || Mount Lemmon Survey || V || align=right data-sort-value="0.63" | 630 m || 
|-id=871 bgcolor=#fefefe
| 386871 ||  || — || October 23, 2006 || Mount Lemmon || Mount Lemmon Survey || FLO || align=right data-sort-value="0.63" | 630 m || 
|-id=872 bgcolor=#fefefe
| 386872 ||  || — || June 2, 2008 || Mount Lemmon || Mount Lemmon Survey || — || align=right data-sort-value="0.75" | 750 m || 
|-id=873 bgcolor=#fefefe
| 386873 ||  || — || November 17, 2009 || Mount Lemmon || Mount Lemmon Survey || V || align=right data-sort-value="0.94" | 940 m || 
|-id=874 bgcolor=#fefefe
| 386874 ||  || — || December 27, 2006 || Mount Lemmon || Mount Lemmon Survey || FLO || align=right data-sort-value="0.67" | 670 m || 
|-id=875 bgcolor=#fefefe
| 386875 ||  || — || February 3, 1997 || Kitt Peak || Spacewatch || NYS || align=right data-sort-value="0.65" | 650 m || 
|-id=876 bgcolor=#fefefe
| 386876 ||  || — || October 18, 2009 || Mount Lemmon || Mount Lemmon Survey || — || align=right data-sort-value="0.74" | 740 m || 
|-id=877 bgcolor=#fefefe
| 386877 ||  || — || March 17, 2004 || Kitt Peak || Spacewatch || — || align=right data-sort-value="0.73" | 730 m || 
|-id=878 bgcolor=#fefefe
| 386878 ||  || — || November 22, 2006 || Kitt Peak || Spacewatch || — || align=right | 1.0 km || 
|-id=879 bgcolor=#fefefe
| 386879 ||  || — || January 30, 2004 || Kitt Peak || Spacewatch || — || align=right data-sort-value="0.76" | 760 m || 
|-id=880 bgcolor=#fefefe
| 386880 ||  || — || January 10, 2007 || Kitt Peak || Spacewatch || — || align=right | 1.1 km || 
|-id=881 bgcolor=#fefefe
| 386881 ||  || — || March 28, 2004 || Kitt Peak || Spacewatch || — || align=right data-sort-value="0.91" | 910 m || 
|-id=882 bgcolor=#fefefe
| 386882 ||  || — || September 20, 2008 || Catalina || CSS || — || align=right | 1.3 km || 
|-id=883 bgcolor=#fefefe
| 386883 ||  || — || November 23, 2006 || Mount Lemmon || Mount Lemmon Survey || — || align=right data-sort-value="0.92" | 920 m || 
|-id=884 bgcolor=#fefefe
| 386884 ||  || — || October 4, 2002 || Socorro || LINEAR || — || align=right data-sort-value="0.90" | 900 m || 
|-id=885 bgcolor=#fefefe
| 386885 ||  || — || October 14, 2009 || Mount Lemmon || Mount Lemmon Survey || — || align=right data-sort-value="0.96" | 960 m || 
|-id=886 bgcolor=#fefefe
| 386886 ||  || — || August 31, 2005 || Kitt Peak || Spacewatch || — || align=right data-sort-value="0.99" | 990 m || 
|-id=887 bgcolor=#fefefe
| 386887 ||  || — || October 27, 2009 || Mount Lemmon || Mount Lemmon Survey || V || align=right data-sort-value="0.83" | 830 m || 
|-id=888 bgcolor=#fefefe
| 386888 ||  || — || November 24, 2009 || Kitt Peak || Spacewatch || — || align=right data-sort-value="0.66" | 660 m || 
|-id=889 bgcolor=#fefefe
| 386889 ||  || — || February 18, 2004 || Kitt Peak || Spacewatch || — || align=right data-sort-value="0.68" | 680 m || 
|-id=890 bgcolor=#d6d6d6
| 386890 ||  || — || May 24, 2006 || Mount Lemmon || Mount Lemmon Survey || — || align=right | 4.0 km || 
|-id=891 bgcolor=#fefefe
| 386891 ||  || — || September 19, 2009 || Mount Lemmon || Mount Lemmon Survey || — || align=right data-sort-value="0.98" | 980 m || 
|-id=892 bgcolor=#fefefe
| 386892 ||  || — || April 16, 2001 || Kitt Peak || Spacewatch || — || align=right data-sort-value="0.75" | 750 m || 
|-id=893 bgcolor=#fefefe
| 386893 ||  || — || December 21, 2006 || Kitt Peak || Spacewatch || FLO || align=right data-sort-value="0.58" | 580 m || 
|-id=894 bgcolor=#fefefe
| 386894 ||  || — || January 22, 2004 || Socorro || LINEAR || — || align=right data-sort-value="0.68" | 680 m || 
|-id=895 bgcolor=#E9E9E9
| 386895 ||  || — || January 7, 2010 || Mount Lemmon || Mount Lemmon Survey || — || align=right | 4.6 km || 
|-id=896 bgcolor=#fefefe
| 386896 ||  || — || October 1, 2005 || Mount Lemmon || Mount Lemmon Survey || — || align=right data-sort-value="0.72" | 720 m || 
|-id=897 bgcolor=#fefefe
| 386897 ||  || — || March 23, 2001 || Cima Ekar || ADAS || — || align=right data-sort-value="0.64" | 640 m || 
|-id=898 bgcolor=#E9E9E9
| 386898 ||  || — || December 20, 2009 || Mount Lemmon || Mount Lemmon Survey || — || align=right | 1.4 km || 
|-id=899 bgcolor=#fefefe
| 386899 ||  || — || October 7, 2008 || Mount Lemmon || Mount Lemmon Survey || — || align=right data-sort-value="0.94" | 940 m || 
|-id=900 bgcolor=#fefefe
| 386900 ||  || — || May 15, 2004 || Campo Imperatore || CINEOS || — || align=right data-sort-value="0.95" | 950 m || 
|}

386901–387000 

|-bgcolor=#fefefe
| 386901 ||  || — || February 21, 2007 || Mount Lemmon || Mount Lemmon Survey || NYS || align=right data-sort-value="0.62" | 620 m || 
|-id=902 bgcolor=#fefefe
| 386902 ||  || — || March 25, 2003 || Anderson Mesa || LONEOS || — || align=right data-sort-value="0.86" | 860 m || 
|-id=903 bgcolor=#E9E9E9
| 386903 ||  || — || June 14, 2007 || Kitt Peak || Spacewatch || — || align=right | 1.1 km || 
|-id=904 bgcolor=#fefefe
| 386904 ||  || — || March 10, 2007 || Kitt Peak || Spacewatch || — || align=right data-sort-value="0.90" | 900 m || 
|-id=905 bgcolor=#fefefe
| 386905 ||  || — || December 14, 2001 || Socorro || LINEAR || LCI || align=right | 1.1 km || 
|-id=906 bgcolor=#d6d6d6
| 386906 ||  || — || April 23, 2011 || Kitt Peak || Spacewatch || TIR || align=right | 3.2 km || 
|-id=907 bgcolor=#fefefe
| 386907 ||  || — || January 10, 2007 || Mount Lemmon || Mount Lemmon Survey || V || align=right data-sort-value="0.62" | 620 m || 
|-id=908 bgcolor=#d6d6d6
| 386908 ||  || — || April 13, 2011 || Mount Lemmon || Mount Lemmon Survey || — || align=right | 4.0 km || 
|-id=909 bgcolor=#d6d6d6
| 386909 ||  || — || September 5, 2007 || Catalina || CSS || — || align=right | 3.6 km || 
|-id=910 bgcolor=#E9E9E9
| 386910 ||  || — || April 27, 2011 || Kitt Peak || Spacewatch || — || align=right | 2.7 km || 
|-id=911 bgcolor=#fefefe
| 386911 ||  || — || December 31, 2002 || Socorro || LINEAR || — || align=right data-sort-value="0.95" | 950 m || 
|-id=912 bgcolor=#fefefe
| 386912 ||  || — || November 17, 2006 || Mount Lemmon || Mount Lemmon Survey || FLO || align=right data-sort-value="0.69" | 690 m || 
|-id=913 bgcolor=#fefefe
| 386913 ||  || — || September 27, 2009 || Kitt Peak || Spacewatch || — || align=right data-sort-value="0.71" | 710 m || 
|-id=914 bgcolor=#E9E9E9
| 386914 ||  || — || April 24, 2011 || Kitt Peak || Spacewatch || — || align=right | 2.7 km || 
|-id=915 bgcolor=#fefefe
| 386915 ||  || — || October 9, 2008 || Catalina || CSS || — || align=right | 1.3 km || 
|-id=916 bgcolor=#fefefe
| 386916 ||  || — || January 17, 2007 || Catalina || CSS || — || align=right data-sort-value="0.96" | 960 m || 
|-id=917 bgcolor=#E9E9E9
| 386917 ||  || — || March 20, 2010 || WISE || WISE || KRM || align=right | 2.5 km || 
|-id=918 bgcolor=#fefefe
| 386918 ||  || — || May 31, 2000 || Kitt Peak || Spacewatch || MAS || align=right data-sort-value="0.73" | 730 m || 
|-id=919 bgcolor=#fefefe
| 386919 ||  || — || February 17, 2007 || Mount Lemmon || Mount Lemmon Survey || FLO || align=right data-sort-value="0.73" | 730 m || 
|-id=920 bgcolor=#E9E9E9
| 386920 ||  || — || January 12, 2010 || Mount Lemmon || Mount Lemmon Survey || — || align=right | 4.3 km || 
|-id=921 bgcolor=#fefefe
| 386921 ||  || — || March 22, 2004 || Anderson Mesa || LONEOS || — || align=right data-sort-value="0.84" | 840 m || 
|-id=922 bgcolor=#E9E9E9
| 386922 ||  || — || November 6, 2008 || Catalina || CSS || — || align=right | 2.0 km || 
|-id=923 bgcolor=#E9E9E9
| 386923 ||  || — || October 26, 2008 || Mount Lemmon || Mount Lemmon Survey || EUN || align=right | 1.5 km || 
|-id=924 bgcolor=#fefefe
| 386924 ||  || — || April 20, 2004 || Kitt Peak || Spacewatch || — || align=right data-sort-value="0.88" | 880 m || 
|-id=925 bgcolor=#d6d6d6
| 386925 ||  || — || April 6, 2005 || Catalina || CSS || — || align=right | 4.4 km || 
|-id=926 bgcolor=#fefefe
| 386926 ||  || — || January 27, 2007 || Kitt Peak || Spacewatch || — || align=right data-sort-value="0.82" | 820 m || 
|-id=927 bgcolor=#fefefe
| 386927 ||  || — || October 27, 2005 || Kitt Peak || Spacewatch || — || align=right data-sort-value="0.86" | 860 m || 
|-id=928 bgcolor=#fefefe
| 386928 ||  || — || March 15, 2007 || Kitt Peak || Spacewatch || — || align=right data-sort-value="0.79" | 790 m || 
|-id=929 bgcolor=#d6d6d6
| 386929 ||  || — || September 17, 2006 || Catalina || CSS || — || align=right | 4.9 km || 
|-id=930 bgcolor=#d6d6d6
| 386930 ||  || — || January 1, 2009 || Kitt Peak || Spacewatch || BRA || align=right | 1.9 km || 
|-id=931 bgcolor=#fefefe
| 386931 ||  || — || February 22, 2007 || Catalina || CSS || — || align=right data-sort-value="0.89" | 890 m || 
|-id=932 bgcolor=#E9E9E9
| 386932 ||  || — || December 2, 2008 || Kitt Peak || Spacewatch || — || align=right | 1.3 km || 
|-id=933 bgcolor=#E9E9E9
| 386933 ||  || — || July 16, 2007 || Siding Spring || SSS || — || align=right | 2.6 km || 
|-id=934 bgcolor=#d6d6d6
| 386934 ||  || — || May 13, 2010 || Mount Lemmon || Mount Lemmon Survey || URS || align=right | 3.5 km || 
|-id=935 bgcolor=#E9E9E9
| 386935 ||  || — || September 11, 2007 || Catalina || CSS || EUN || align=right | 1.5 km || 
|-id=936 bgcolor=#E9E9E9
| 386936 ||  || — || October 26, 2008 || Mount Lemmon || Mount Lemmon Survey || — || align=right | 1.3 km || 
|-id=937 bgcolor=#E9E9E9
| 386937 ||  || — || May 17, 2010 || WISE || WISE || ADE || align=right | 3.8 km || 
|-id=938 bgcolor=#fefefe
| 386938 ||  || — || September 27, 2008 || Mount Lemmon || Mount Lemmon Survey || NYS || align=right data-sort-value="0.79" | 790 m || 
|-id=939 bgcolor=#E9E9E9
| 386939 ||  || — || December 31, 2008 || Kitt Peak || Spacewatch || — || align=right | 3.3 km || 
|-id=940 bgcolor=#E9E9E9
| 386940 ||  || — || June 27, 2011 || Mount Lemmon || Mount Lemmon Survey || — || align=right | 2.5 km || 
|-id=941 bgcolor=#d6d6d6
| 386941 ||  || — || September 19, 2006 || Catalina || CSS || — || align=right | 3.3 km || 
|-id=942 bgcolor=#d6d6d6
| 386942 ||  || — || December 17, 2007 || Kitt Peak || Spacewatch || — || align=right | 3.1 km || 
|-id=943 bgcolor=#d6d6d6
| 386943 ||  || — || September 17, 2006 || Kitt Peak || Spacewatch || — || align=right | 3.4 km || 
|-id=944 bgcolor=#d6d6d6
| 386944 ||  || — || September 16, 2006 || Catalina || CSS || — || align=right | 3.9 km || 
|-id=945 bgcolor=#E9E9E9
| 386945 ||  || — || March 8, 1997 || Kitt Peak || Spacewatch || ADE || align=right | 3.2 km || 
|-id=946 bgcolor=#E9E9E9
| 386946 ||  || — || June 19, 2006 || Mount Lemmon || Mount Lemmon Survey || MRX || align=right | 1.2 km || 
|-id=947 bgcolor=#d6d6d6
| 386947 ||  || — || December 29, 2003 || Kitt Peak || Spacewatch || TRP || align=right | 3.4 km || 
|-id=948 bgcolor=#d6d6d6
| 386948 ||  || — || September 26, 2006 || Kitt Peak || Spacewatch || VER || align=right | 2.4 km || 
|-id=949 bgcolor=#d6d6d6
| 386949 ||  || — || September 28, 2006 || Catalina || CSS || EOS || align=right | 2.7 km || 
|-id=950 bgcolor=#d6d6d6
| 386950 ||  || — || March 26, 2003 || Kitt Peak || Spacewatch || — || align=right | 4.0 km || 
|-id=951 bgcolor=#d6d6d6
| 386951 ||  || — || May 16, 2004 || Kitt Peak || Spacewatch || — || align=right | 3.6 km || 
|-id=952 bgcolor=#d6d6d6
| 386952 ||  || — || September 20, 2011 || Kitt Peak || Spacewatch || — || align=right | 4.6 km || 
|-id=953 bgcolor=#d6d6d6
| 386953 ||  || — || September 14, 2005 || Kitt Peak || Spacewatch || EOS || align=right | 2.0 km || 
|-id=954 bgcolor=#d6d6d6
| 386954 ||  || — || October 1, 2005 || Kitt Peak || Spacewatch || — || align=right | 4.0 km || 
|-id=955 bgcolor=#d6d6d6
| 386955 ||  || — || September 1, 2005 || Kitt Peak || Spacewatch || HYG || align=right | 2.8 km || 
|-id=956 bgcolor=#d6d6d6
| 386956 ||  || — || October 3, 2006 || Mount Lemmon || Mount Lemmon Survey || HYG || align=right | 2.8 km || 
|-id=957 bgcolor=#d6d6d6
| 386957 ||  || — || December 20, 2007 || Mount Lemmon || Mount Lemmon Survey || — || align=right | 3.9 km || 
|-id=958 bgcolor=#E9E9E9
| 386958 ||  || — || May 4, 2006 || Siding Spring || SSS || JUN || align=right | 1.3 km || 
|-id=959 bgcolor=#d6d6d6
| 386959 ||  || — || March 7, 2003 || Kitt Peak || Spacewatch || — || align=right | 4.4 km || 
|-id=960 bgcolor=#d6d6d6
| 386960 ||  || — || June 17, 2005 || Mount Lemmon || Mount Lemmon Survey || — || align=right | 4.2 km || 
|-id=961 bgcolor=#d6d6d6
| 386961 ||  || — || April 25, 2004 || Kitt Peak || Spacewatch || THM || align=right | 2.7 km || 
|-id=962 bgcolor=#d6d6d6
| 386962 ||  || — || February 27, 2009 || Mount Lemmon || Mount Lemmon Survey || — || align=right | 3.1 km || 
|-id=963 bgcolor=#d6d6d6
| 386963 ||  || — || August 30, 2005 || Kitt Peak || Spacewatch || — || align=right | 3.2 km || 
|-id=964 bgcolor=#d6d6d6
| 386964 ||  || — || February 6, 2003 || Kitt Peak || Spacewatch || — || align=right | 3.6 km || 
|-id=965 bgcolor=#d6d6d6
| 386965 ||  || — || December 31, 2007 || Kitt Peak || Spacewatch || — || align=right | 3.0 km || 
|-id=966 bgcolor=#C2FFFF
| 386966 ||  || — || August 18, 2009 || Kitt Peak || Spacewatch || L4 || align=right | 7.7 km || 
|-id=967 bgcolor=#C2FFFF
| 386967 ||  || — || February 2, 2001 || Kitt Peak || Spacewatch || L4ERY || align=right | 7.7 km || 
|-id=968 bgcolor=#C7FF8F
| 386968 ||  || — || December 30, 2008 || Kitt Peak || Spacewatch || centaur || align=right | 60 km || 
|-id=969 bgcolor=#fefefe
| 386969 ||  || — || April 22, 2007 || Mount Lemmon || Mount Lemmon Survey || H || align=right data-sort-value="0.76" | 760 m || 
|-id=970 bgcolor=#fefefe
| 386970 ||  || — || April 20, 2007 || Kitt Peak || Spacewatch || H || align=right data-sort-value="0.62" | 620 m || 
|-id=971 bgcolor=#fefefe
| 386971 ||  || — || March 8, 2006 || Mount Lemmon || Mount Lemmon Survey || H || align=right data-sort-value="0.58" | 580 m || 
|-id=972 bgcolor=#d6d6d6
| 386972 ||  || — || August 9, 2007 || Socorro || LINEAR || — || align=right | 3.7 km || 
|-id=973 bgcolor=#fefefe
| 386973 ||  || — || May 2, 2008 || Mount Lemmon || Mount Lemmon Survey || — || align=right | 1.0 km || 
|-id=974 bgcolor=#d6d6d6
| 386974 ||  || — || May 24, 2006 || Kitt Peak || Spacewatch || — || align=right | 3.6 km || 
|-id=975 bgcolor=#fefefe
| 386975 ||  || — || October 12, 2005 || Kitt Peak || Spacewatch || H || align=right data-sort-value="0.64" | 640 m || 
|-id=976 bgcolor=#fefefe
| 386976 ||  || — || September 16, 2009 || Catalina || CSS || — || align=right data-sort-value="0.68" | 680 m || 
|-id=977 bgcolor=#fefefe
| 386977 ||  || — || March 29, 2011 || Kitt Peak || Spacewatch || — || align=right | 1.2 km || 
|-id=978 bgcolor=#E9E9E9
| 386978 ||  || — || September 20, 2008 || Catalina || CSS || — || align=right | 1.8 km || 
|-id=979 bgcolor=#fefefe
| 386979 ||  || — || May 29, 2008 || Kitt Peak || Spacewatch || — || align=right data-sort-value="0.81" | 810 m || 
|-id=980 bgcolor=#fefefe
| 386980 ||  || — || October 19, 2001 || Kitt Peak || Spacewatch || NYS || align=right data-sort-value="0.72" | 720 m || 
|-id=981 bgcolor=#E9E9E9
| 386981 ||  || — || January 14, 2010 || Mount Lemmon || Mount Lemmon Survey || — || align=right | 1.3 km || 
|-id=982 bgcolor=#fefefe
| 386982 ||  || — || February 8, 2007 || Kitt Peak || Spacewatch || — || align=right data-sort-value="0.91" | 910 m || 
|-id=983 bgcolor=#fefefe
| 386983 ||  || — || March 13, 2007 || Mount Lemmon || Mount Lemmon Survey || — || align=right | 1.4 km || 
|-id=984 bgcolor=#fefefe
| 386984 ||  || — || September 5, 2005 || Siding Spring || SSS || PHO || align=right | 1.2 km || 
|-id=985 bgcolor=#fefefe
| 386985 ||  || — || February 12, 2004 || Kitt Peak || Spacewatch || FLO || align=right data-sort-value="0.70" | 700 m || 
|-id=986 bgcolor=#fefefe
| 386986 ||  || — || May 13, 2007 || Mount Lemmon || Mount Lemmon Survey || V || align=right data-sort-value="0.98" | 980 m || 
|-id=987 bgcolor=#E9E9E9
| 386987 ||  || — || March 10, 2007 || Mount Lemmon || Mount Lemmon Survey || EUN || align=right | 1.1 km || 
|-id=988 bgcolor=#fefefe
| 386988 ||  || — || December 25, 2005 || Kitt Peak || Spacewatch || — || align=right data-sort-value="0.79" | 790 m || 
|-id=989 bgcolor=#E9E9E9
| 386989 ||  || — || August 24, 1998 || Socorro || LINEAR || — || align=right | 2.4 km || 
|-id=990 bgcolor=#fefefe
| 386990 ||  || — || July 25, 2008 || Mount Lemmon || Mount Lemmon Survey || — || align=right | 1.3 km || 
|-id=991 bgcolor=#d6d6d6
| 386991 ||  || — || September 30, 2007 || Kitt Peak || Spacewatch || — || align=right | 2.5 km || 
|-id=992 bgcolor=#E9E9E9
| 386992 ||  || — || May 20, 2006 || Mount Lemmon || Mount Lemmon Survey || — || align=right | 2.8 km || 
|-id=993 bgcolor=#E9E9E9
| 386993 ||  || — || January 19, 2005 || Kitt Peak || Spacewatch || — || align=right | 1.9 km || 
|-id=994 bgcolor=#fefefe
| 386994 ||  || — || August 4, 2008 || Siding Spring || SSS || V || align=right data-sort-value="0.86" | 860 m || 
|-id=995 bgcolor=#E9E9E9
| 386995 ||  || — || October 6, 2008 || Kitt Peak || Spacewatch || — || align=right | 1.4 km || 
|-id=996 bgcolor=#fefefe
| 386996 ||  || — || February 2, 2006 || Mount Lemmon || Mount Lemmon Survey || — || align=right | 1.3 km || 
|-id=997 bgcolor=#E9E9E9
| 386997 ||  || — || September 24, 2008 || Catalina || CSS || — || align=right | 1.9 km || 
|-id=998 bgcolor=#E9E9E9
| 386998 ||  || — || November 30, 2005 || Mount Lemmon || Mount Lemmon Survey || — || align=right | 2.0 km || 
|-id=999 bgcolor=#fefefe
| 386999 ||  || — || August 4, 2008 || Siding Spring || SSS || — || align=right | 1.1 km || 
|-id=000 bgcolor=#d6d6d6
| 387000 ||  || — || January 31, 2009 || Kitt Peak || Spacewatch || — || align=right | 3.1 km || 
|}

References

External links 
 Discovery Circumstances: Numbered Minor Planets (385001)–(390000) (IAU Minor Planet Center)

0386